= Phreaking box =

Device used for unofficial access to telephone networks

A phreaking box is a device used by phone phreaks to perform various functions normally reserved for operators and other telephone company employees.

Most phreaking boxes are named after colors, due to folklore surrounding the earliest boxes which suggested that the first ones of each kind were housed in a box or casing of that color. However, very few physical specimens of phreaking boxes are actually the color for which they are named.

Most phreaking boxes are electronic devices which interface directly with a telephone line and manipulate the line or the greater system in some way through either by generating audible tones that invoke switching functions (for example, a blue box), or by manipulating the electrical characteristics of the line to disrupt normal line function (for example, a black box). However a few boxes can use mechanical or acoustic methods - for example, it is possible to use a pair of properly tuned whistles as a red box.

== List of phreaking box types ==
This is not a comprehensive list. Many text files online describe various "boxes" in a long list of colors, some of which are fictional (parodies or concepts which never worked), minor variants of boxes already listed or aftermarket versions of features (line in use indicators, 'hold' and 'conference' buttons) commonly included in standard multi-line phones.

This list of boxes does not include wiretapping "bugs", pirate broadcasting apparatus or exploits involving computer security.

| Blue box | Tone generator, emits a 2600 Hz tone to disconnect a long-distance call while retaining control of a trunk, then generates multi-frequency tones to make another toll call which is not detected properly by billing equipment. |
| Black box | A resistor bypassed with a capacitor and placed in series with the line to limit DC current on received calls. On some mechanical relay switching systems, separate relays were used to stop ringing on an inbound call and to start billing timers. The black box was intended to trip one but not both relays, allowing ringing to stop but not showing the call as answered for billing purposes. |
| Red box | Tone generator, emits a Coin Denomination Tone (CDT) tone pair (1700 Hz and 2200 Hz) to signal coins dropping into a payphone. |
| Green box | Tone generator, emits 'coin accept', 'coin return' and 'ringback' tones at the remote end of an Automated Coin Toll Service payphone call. |
| Clear box | Microphone and amplifier, coupled inductively to payphones where the handset microphone (and just the microphone) was disabled until a coin was inserted. An "opaque box" was a variant which also included a keypad. Obsolete as specific to a rarely used post-paid coin phone design which is no longer deployed. |
| Violet box | A resistor (several hundred ohms) which can be clipped directly across the line to make it appear off-hook or in use. |
| Gold box | Diverter. Calls received on one line are forwarded elsewhere using a second telephone line. |
| Beige box | Telephone installer's test handset; a standard telephone set on which the plug has been replaced with a pair of alligator clips. |
| White box | In Australia there was a software program based on the Commodore Amiga 500 personal computer called White box which was used for phreaking. It used CCITT#5- (R2) tones to manipulate the phone systems in Australia in a similar way to blue boxing (See screenshot on External links section). In other countries white box can be referred to a Portable DTMF-dial keypad with a speaker which can be used to access an answering machine to hear your messages when you are away from home and also can be used on PBX phone systems that require tone dialling and used to generate tones if the telephone is rotary-dial or its keypad is locked. |
| Silver box | Tone-dial keypad with four extra buttons (A, B, C, D) formerly used to indicate priority on military autovon calls. |
| Magenta box | AC ringing current generator, connected directly to a telephone to make that phone ring. |
| Orange box | Caller ID frequency-shift keying generator, connected directly to a telephone to send CID. |
| Vermilion box | The combination of a magenta box and an orange box. |
| DLoC box | The combination of a beige box and a two-line conferencer. |

== See also ==
- Walter L. Shaw
- John Draper
- Phreaking
- Dual-tone multi-frequency signaling
