= Novation CAT =

Series of computer modems

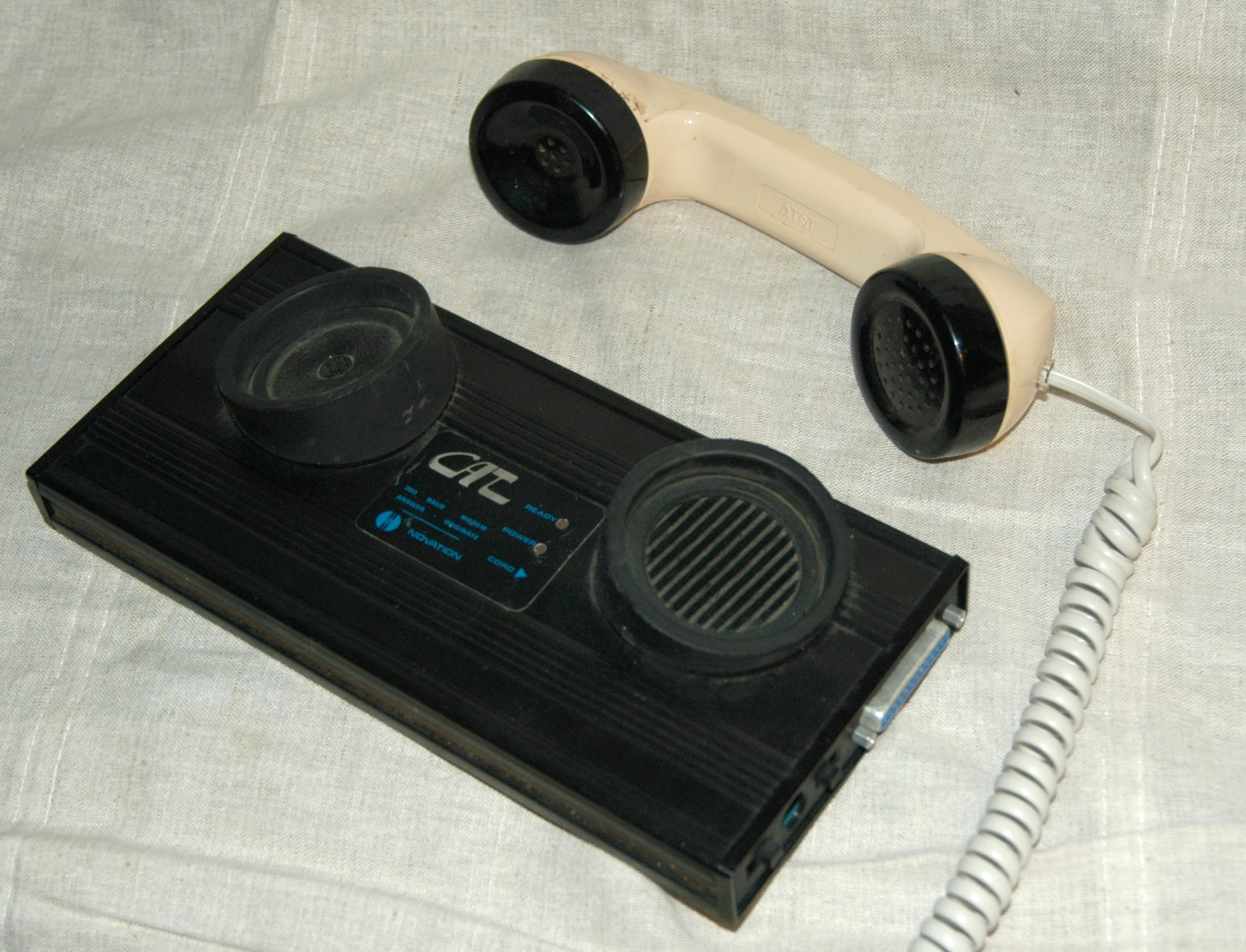
The original Novation CAT

Novation, Inc., is an early modem manufacturer whose CAT series were popular in the early home computer market in the late 1970s and early 1980s, notably on the Apple II. The Hayes Smartmodem 300, introduced in 1981, helped kill off Novation and many other early modem companies over the next few years.

== The Original CAT ==
Novation's first CAT was an external 300 bit/s Bell 103-standard modem that connected to the phone lines using an acoustic coupler. Like most other acoustically coupled modems, the CAT required the user to dial the desired number on a normal telephone, listening to the call connecting and the eventual presence of an answer tone. If the dialling was successful, the user then pressed the handset down into rubber cups on the modem to connect. This was only possible because telephones were generally available only from Western Electric, and almost all customers had a Model 500 telephone of a standardized size and layout. There was no sort of automated operation available; even hanging up had to be done manually by returning the handset to the telephone and thereby pressing the hook button.

The original CAT was popular in the late 1970s, and was resold by a number of companies under white label arrangements. This included most home computer vendors, including Apple Computer, Atari, Texas Instruments and Tandy, among others.

== The Apple-CAT II ==
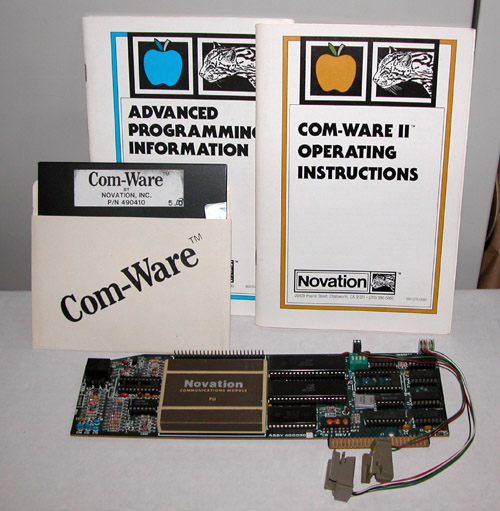
The Apple-CAT II modem, along with Com-Ware II software and Advanced Programming Information manual.

Novation also introduced an internal direct-connect modem, the Apple-CAT II, which plugged into an expansion slot in an Apple II computer. Due to the internal connection, the Apple-CAT II was able to feature a full range of dialing commands, and could report a wide range of call progress tones (BUSY, REORDER, etc.) that many modems still lack today. These operations were handled directly by software on the host computer; the modem set certain registers when tones were heard on the line, and by timing when these registers were set or cleared, the software could determine what was happening on the line.

The Apple-CAT II also supported the Bell 202 protocol, which allowed half-duplex 1200 bit/s operation when connecting to another Apple-CAT II modem. This was an exceptionally rare feature; modems with "full" 1200 bit/s operation were expensive devices intended to be used with minicomputers and mainframes, and typically cost thousands of dollars. Since the 1200 bit/s mode was half-duplex, or one-way only, the users would normally have to decide in advance which direction transmissions would proceed.

However, software was used to work around this limitation as well. File transfer programs are written specifically for the Apple-CAT II's 202 mode, such as Catsend and the later CatFur, periodically paused and reversed transmission direction, so the receiving computer could acknowledge receipt of a stream of data, and, in the case of CatFur, could add a short chat message to the sender in the middle of the one-way file transfer. Many bulletin board systems (BBSs) running CatSend and then CatFur were set up to transfer warez. One BBS program that worked around this limitation was Tele-Cat II, which used escape sequences to switch between 202 half-duplex 1200 bits/second mode (for sending data) and Bell 103 full-duplex 300 bits/second mode (for receiving user input). The 202 CatFur protocol could only be used if both ends of the communication were using Apple-CAT II modems.

In addition, the Apple-CAT II had the ability to support CCITT v.21 and CCITT v.23, the European standards for 300 and 300/1200 baud operation (as opposed to the normal Bell 103/202 versions). Though no known applications took advantage of this facility, it was possible to modify certain software such as ASCII Express by use of a hex editor to take advantage of this feature.

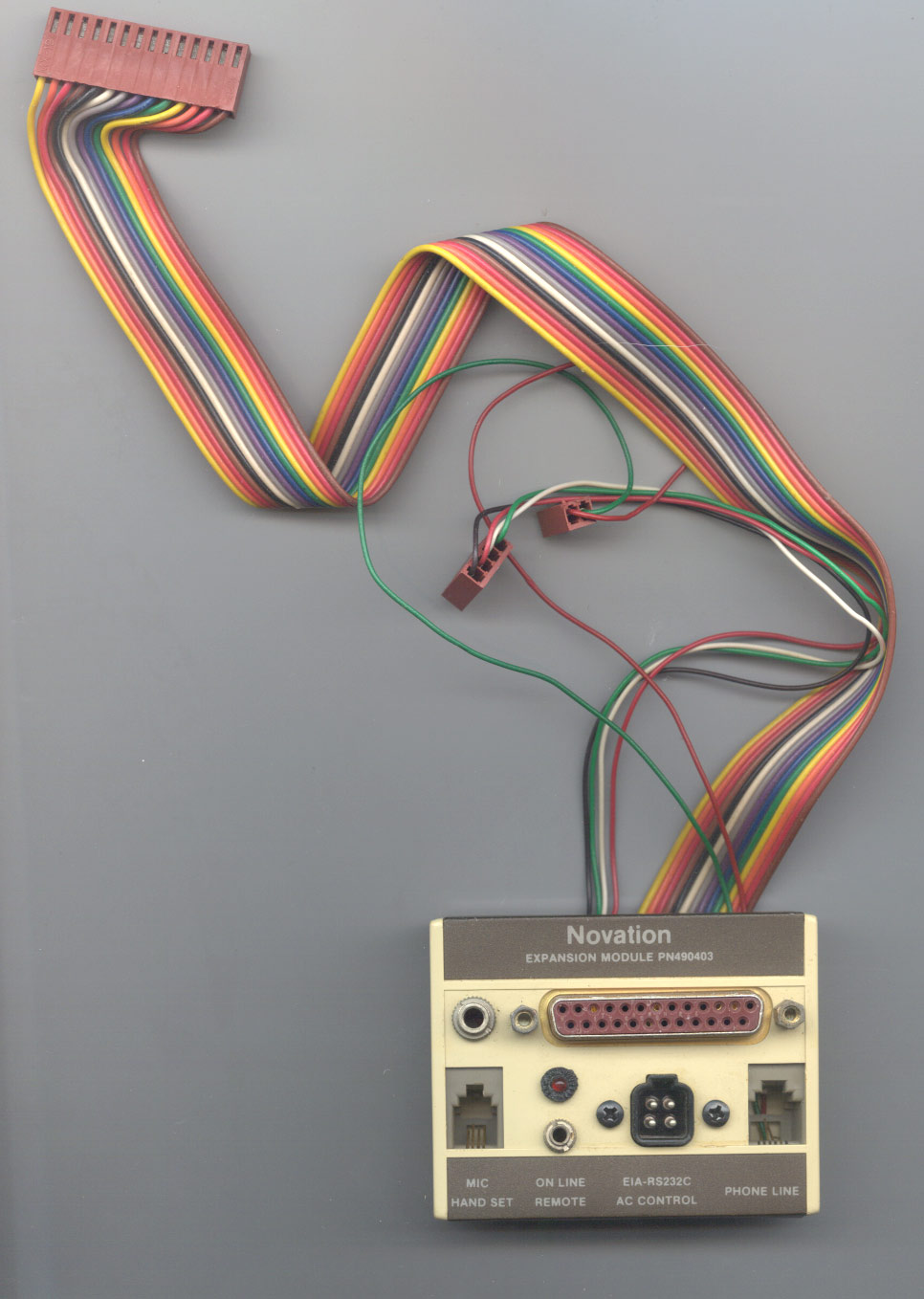
The Apple-CAT II 'Expansion Pack'

Novation also released a full-duplex Bell 212-compatible expansion board known as the Novation 212 Expansion Card, which plugged into the Apple II motherboard as well as an existing Apple-CAT II via a ribbon cable. The card was very expensive and rarely seen. Novation also created an 'Expansion Pack' or external breakout box that would connect to the large pin header on the top middle of the card. This item allowed easy external access to the built-in serial port, phone line and handset connections. Due to its cost at the time, the item is very rare.

The Apple-CAT II was popular with phone phreakers for its high half-duplex 1200 bit/s speed and its ability to detect various tones. It also had the ability to generate tones directly into the phone line. Several specialized applications such as TSPS, The Cats Meow and Phantom Access were used to mimic standard telephone sounds such as standard numeric DTMF dial tones as well as blue box tones, ringing (both American and International), dial tones, call waiting alerts, busy signals, 2600 Hz tones, and other effects such as payphone sounds. Due to these and other features, the Apple-CAT II could be used as a black box, red box, hacking tool, answering machine, war dialer, voice simulator, voice distorter, etc.

BYTE criticized Novation, stating that "the company's literature should be very explicit" about the modem's inability to communicate at 1200 baud with Bell 212 modems without the expansion card, but concluded that "Apple users shopping for a modem would be wise to consider this system very carefully". Despite the Apple-CAT II's popularity, its early years were faced with incompatibility with most telecommunications programs, as its native API is considered proprietary by today's standards. To increase compatibility without re-coding these programs, Novation released a firmware upgrade kit (an EPROM package) allowing the modem to emulate the Hayes Micromodem II, including the MMII's IN#x control codes. At the Apple-CAT II's peak, compatibility with its native API increased, and MMII emulation became less of a necessity.

== The D-CAT ==
A direct-connect version of the original 300 bit/s external modem was later released as the D-CAT. The "D" stood for "direct": the modem was directly connected into the handset jack of the telephone instead of requiring acoustic coupling. To operate the D-CAT, a number was dialed on the telephone and the user waited for a carrier signal from the modem being called, just as with an acoustic modem. When a carrier signal was received, a button was pressed on the D-CAT which made it produce a carrier signal and establish a connection with the modem being called, then the handset would be left off-hook. A further improvement was the Auto-CAT, which allowed dialing the phone by entering the number when the modem was first started. Once the connection was made, the modem switched to "data mode", and from then on had to be operated manually.

== The J-CAT ==
The J-CAT was Novation's first attempt to make a "smart modem", albeit in a rather non-standard fashion. Its most basic feature was that J-CAT could be placed in a mode where it would automatically pick up the phone if it was called, offering rudimentary auto-answer capability. In an era when it could be safely assumed that the remote user would hang up when they were finished their call, as they were likely using an acoustic coupler modem like the original CAT, the lack of a "hang up my phone" command was not a real problem. This made the J-CAT useful for BBS use; Novation ran a simple one to allow users to test their new modems.

The J-CAT also supported another non-standard feature that allowed direct control of the phone line. Instead of using in-band signalling, like the Smartmodem, the J-CAT passed the on/off-hook control, carrier detect and phone status indication to the computer through otherwise unused pins in the RS-232C connector. The computer could pulse the hook line to simulate pulse dialing or hang up, and read the status pin to look for line signals like ringing or busy (any noise on the line was reported as "1"). Using these features required a computer able to signal on spare pins, often requiring a second connector and a custom cable to support it. Combined with proper software this made the J-CAT fairly "smart", although Novation was careful to state it was not a "smart modem". Operation was generally similar to the Apple-CAT in concept. The J-CAT was released after the Smartmodem 300, so it was never very popular even though it was fairly low-cost (for the era).

== The AutoCat and 212 AutoCat ==
The AutoCat series consisted of the AutoCat and 212 AutoCat, which were direct-connect modems with auto-answer capabilities.

== The Smart-CAT 103 & Smart-CAT 103-212 ==
Novation eventually introduced their own standard smart modems, the Smart-CAT 103 and Smart-CAT 103-212. As the names imply, the later included 1200 bit/s Bell 212 operation in addition to 300 bit/s Bell 103. The later was also offered as the 212 Apple-CAT II, as an internal modem. These models had little to distinguish themselves from other Smartmodem clones, and Novation appears to have disappeared in the early 1980s.

== Notes ==
The original CAT was also sold in re-branded form by a number of companies.

- Apple Inc. as the Modem IIA and Modem IIB
- Atari as the Atari 830 Modem.
- Texas Instruments as the TI Phone Interface
- Radio Shack/Tandy as the TRS-80 Telephone Interface II
- Nixdorf Computer AG as the Modem LK-4040
