= Joybubbles (film) =

2026 American documentary film

- Directed by: Rachael J. Morrison
- Produced by: Sarah Winshall
- Release date: January 26, 2026 (Sundance)
- Country: United States
- Language: English

Joybubbles is a 2026 American documentary film directed by Rachael J. Morrison and produced by Sarah Winshall. It was selected to premiere at the U.S. Documentary Competition at the 2026 Sundance Film Festival.

== Premise ==
Born blind and yearning for connection, Joybubbles (Joe Engressia) discovers he can manipulate the telephone system by whistling a tone, a fascination that helps lay the groundwork for a subculture that shapes the future of hacking and technology. The film chronicles Joybubbles' life from his lonely childhood alongside his blind sister through his rebellious college years, during which he sought autonomy in an environment hostile to people with disabilities. It also examines his connection to the broader Phone Phreaks subculture, whose methods influenced pioneers including Steve Wozniak and Steve Jobs in developing the blue box and, later, Apple Inc.

== Production ==
Director Rachael J. Morrison first came across the story of Joe Engressia while reading his obituary in The New York Times. The film was edited by Bradford Thomason and Patrick Lawrence. Lawrence, primarily a narrative editor, spent approximately two months building an assembly cut using only audio recordings — with no visuals — before any footage was incorporated. Thomason joined the project in 2024 to help consolidate earlier rough assemblies and shape the final film. Morrison's presentation features a black, static-filled visual frame intended to evoke Engressia's perspective as a blind person, with a rich sonic language drawn from his own home recordings.

== Release ==
The film premiered at the 2026 Sundance Film Festival as part of the U.S. Documentary Competition, and was available online to the public through the festival's at-home program. Following its Sundance premiere, Visit Films acquired international sales rights and introduced the film to buyers at the European Film Market in February 2026.

== Reception ==
Writing for RogerEbert.com, Robert Daniels praised the film's "modesty and sincerity" and its "considered aesthetics and rich sonic language," describing it as "downright dream-affirming." He noted that while the film attempts to address multiple subjects—emotional wounds, disability, and Phone Phreak subculture—Engressia's warmth as a subject papers over any "narrative hiccups".

On review aggregator website Rotten Tomatoes, the film holds an approval rating of 82% based on 11 reviews, with an average rating of 7.3/10.
