= Vermilion box =

A vermilion box is a (hypothetical) portable telephone line emulator used for phreaking, whose function is to spoof all of the aspects of an incoming phone call—DC line voltage, an AC ringing signal and caller ID—while the line is disconnected from the public switched telephone network (PSTN), as well as allow the user to communicate with the recipient if the call is answered. Its use requires a physical connection to the circuit somewhere between the target premises and the exchange (in either the local loop or the access network), but when properly applied, results in a stealth-intensive incoming call that appears completely genuine but which cannot be electronically traced. Typically, the user physically disconnects the target line from the network or causes an outage in the system, connects the vermilion box, and then initiates the illicit call.

== Components ==
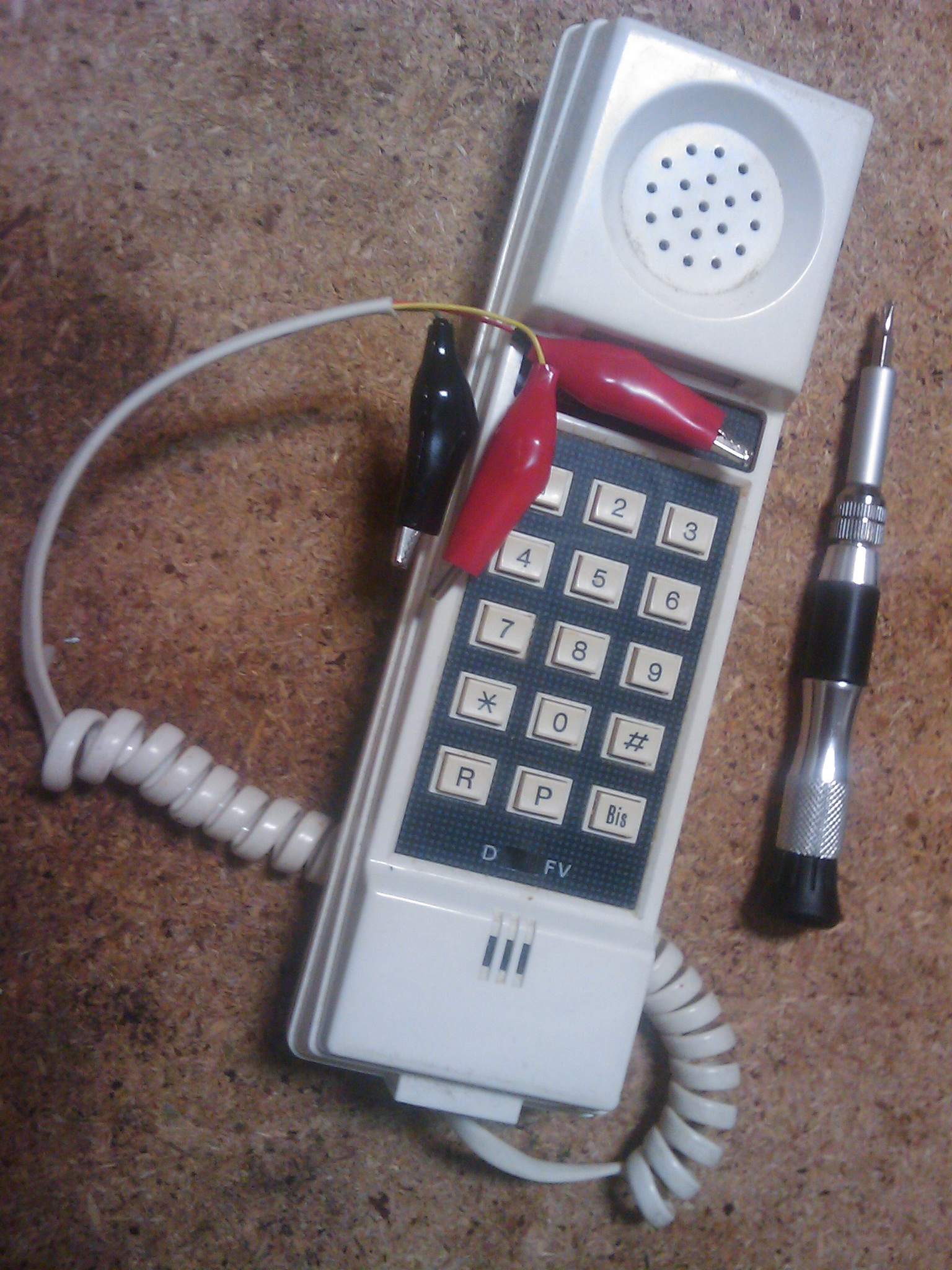
Improvised beige box

The device incorporates the functions of three more basic phreaking boxes:

1. A magenta box, which generates the AC ringing signal required to make the target telephone ring.
2. An orange box, which uses frequency-shift keying to transmit the desired caller ID information, modified to also produce an on-hook (idle state) signal.
3. A beige box, used to conduct the call itself.

In addition, a direct current (DC) source is required to supply power to the telephones on the target's line in the absence of the network.

== Name ==
The vermilion box follows the tradition of naming phreaking boxes after colors, with vermilion being a color similar to a combination of orange and magenta, two of the component boxes which it aggregates the functions of.

== Use in spoofing attacks ==
The use of a vermilion box has sometimes been posited as an element in socially-engineered spoofing attacks where the caller ID of an incoming call serves to implicitly identify an attacker as someone who is authorized to receive the desired information or system access. However even if proven its efficacy in such operations was short-lived, as at approximately the same time telemarketers began using the ability of Primary Rate Interface (ISDN-PRI) connections to transmit caller ID information of their choosing as a means of increasing their contact rate, which quickly lead to widespread mistrust of caller ID among the public.

== See also ==
- Analog telephone adapter (ATA), a device which allows traditional telephones that are intended for use with the PSTN to function with Voice over IP (VoIP) services. These are perhaps the archetype of vermilion boxes as they both generate a ringing signal and transmit caller ID information as needed, the precise combination of functions supplied by an orange box and magenta box that the vermilion color is intended to represent. They also include a power inverter to provide the 48VDC loop supply needed by the customer-premises equipment while a vermillion box is connected, and further add a dial tone generator which is sometimes mentioned as the final element needed to ensure that a target remained unaware that a call was not being conducted over the network.
  - In theory, a two-line adapter configured for ringdown (where taking one side off-hook causes the other to ring) that was pre-configured with the desired Caller Name Delivery and number could serve as a miniature vermilion box. If integrated into a handset, it would then require only a DC power source and greatly simplify operation.
