= Captain Crunch (disambiguation) =

Cap'n Crunch is a brand of breakfast cereal and its identically-named cartoon mascot.

Captain Crunch may refer to:

- John Draper, a phone phreaker who used Captain Crunch as an alias
- Chris Pronger, a hockey player with that nickname
