= Black box (phreaking) =

Electronic device to avoid phone charges

Black boxes were devices which, when attached to home phones, allowed all incoming calls to be received without charge to the caller.

The black box (as distinguished from blue boxes and red boxes) was a small electronic circuit, usually a resistor or zener diode in series with the line. It relied on (now-obsolete) telephone exchanges controlled by mechanical relays.

These exchanges used a relay to detect a drop in line voltage (usually to less than -10V off-hook, compared to -48V when on-hook) to begin billing for a call; a separate relay controlled ringing on the line. The black box placed a resistor in series with the line, so that the off-hook voltage was closer to -36V: just enough to stop the ringing, but not enough to trigger billing. A bypass capacitor was often added to prevent the device from attenuating AC signals such as transmitted voice.

A call originating from a telephone fitted with a black box would still be charged for by the telephone company unless some method to circumvent the call charging was deployed. Black boxes were commonly built by phone phreaks during the 1960s to 1980s (and in some places like Eastern Europe, well into the 2000s) in order to provide callers with free telephone calls. Sometimes several friends would incorporate a black box into each of their telephones to enable them to hold long conversations with each other without having to pay for them. Another use of black boxes was in the incoming modems of computers running bulletin board systems that were popular back in the 1980s and early 90s.

Electronic switching systems rendered black boxes obsolete, as no audio path was established until the call was answered. The infinity transmitter, an eavesdropping device which in its original design relied on an audio path to the target line remaining open before a call was answered or after it was hung up by the recipient, was similarly affected by the demise of mechanical switching.

== See also ==
- Phreaking
