= Theft of services =

Use of services without legally compensating providers

Theft of services is the legal term for a crime which is committed when a person obtains valuable services — as opposed to goods — by deception, force, threat or other unlawful means, i.e., without lawfully compensating the provider for these services. It may also overlap with some types of fraud in which payment is made on credit, but under an assumed identity, and ultimately disavowed ("identity theft").

== Types ==
Crimes of this sort are typically prosecuted as larceny, and may be either a misdemeanor or a felony, based upon the value of the services illegally obtained. This category encompasses a wide variety of criminal activity including tampering with (or bypassing) a utility meter so that the true level of consumption is understated, leaving a hotel or restaurant or similar establishment without paying for the service and "turnstile jumping" or other methods of evading the payment of a fare or fee when using a public transit vehicle or entering a private facility normally requiring payment (e.g., jumping over the fence at a fair or concert). Theft of services also occurs in the taxi industry, when a passenger in a taxi flees from the taxi to avoid paying the fee. Another common form is using another entity's dumpster without their permission, as this creates an expense to the party paying for the service.

Theft of this sort should not be confused with reasonable rejection, where, for example, a customer does not pay because the services provided were not as advertised or because the services did not meet reasonable standards of quality. For example, if a roofer installs a new roof, but the roof leaks, the customer might be able to withhold payment until the leak has been fixed. Withholding of payment without reason would be considered larceny.

== See also ==
- Uttering, including use of forged passes, tickets, coupons, etc.
- Fraud, specifically to obtain services.
- Blue box, red box: theft of telephone service, usually toll charges, using a tone generator.
- Cable theft, illegal access to cable television systems.
- Wage theft, failure to pay full wages earned.
