= Green box (phreaking) =

In Phreaking, the green box was a device whose function was to manipulate the coin collection mechanism of payphones. It employed three of the MF (multi-frequency) tones used in the blue box and could be viewed as a subset of that device.

== Operation ==
There are three basic functions in a green box, and each one is activated with an MF tone. The green box's designers have noted that it is not possible to use the green box from the payphone being manipulated; it can only be used by the called party.

Green Box MF frequencies
Function	Frequencies	MF Symbol
Coin Collect	700 Hz + 1100 Hz	2
Coin Return	1100 Hz + 1700 Hz	KP
Ringback	700 Hz + 1700 Hz	11/ST3

According to the text file "The Green Box" by "The Blue Buccaneer" and "The Tracker", each of these frequencies should be sounded for at least 900 milliseconds. Each should also be preceded with a 2600 Hz "wink", or an MF "8" symbol (900 Hz + 1500 Hz), of about 90 ms in duration, followed by about 60 ms of silence. Most software green boxes emulate this rather than the MF symbols alone.

== History ==
The green box was first proposed in the newsletter TAP in 1981 by Ted Vail and Nick Haflinger. While others have written text files about this device, and numerous software tone generators exist which claim to emulate it, it is unknown if any physical devices were actually built (including by Vail and Haflinger). Despite this, any blue box could, with skillful timing on the part of its user, be used as a green box.

With the widespread phase-out of the ACTS signaling system, and indeed the long-completed phase-out of MF signaling in North America, the telephones for which this device was designed are no longer in service. Thus the green box can be considered obsolete.

An early predecessor of the green box with similar usage was the "payphone diode" or "one-armed bandit". This was a cheap silicon low-power diode that was bridged across two signal wires into the phone (polarity selected so that the diode is normally reverse-biased, otherwise it would permanently short the line). This device exploited another weakness in the ACTS on certain phone models (including 3 slot rotary). These models used an electromechanical diverter flap to drop and direct coins from the holding area to either the coin vault or the coin return, based on a signal from the CO. The default position of this flap was to the coin return so no signal was required for incomplete calls. The diode allowed the coin drop on the Collect ACTS signal but kept the flap in the default position.

Besides being illegal for several reasons, access to the lines on payphones is usually limited by conduit or armor, but only for the first few, usually six to ten, feet. Payphones modified with discrete jumper wires for diodes to be clipped on were very popular in the early 1970s. Contrary to the green box, the diode allowed control from the calling payphone. A modified phone with a poor-quality diode could be quickly identified by the constant clicking sound produced by the coin return mechanism. The single payphone at Canadian Village (also known as Lake Shore) located on the road to the marina of Huntington Lake in California was well known for this issue. Children would gather in the area to collect coins after a caller left, often to buy candy at the store across the road. Operation required using actual coins, and lengthy long-distance calls with mid-call collect signals required deft manipulation of the noisy coins falling to the return, usually by covering the microphone with the hand or simply turning one's back to the phone.

More recent research (2001) on a Flowbox by "Flame0ut & PrussianSnow" on Nortel Millennium payphones in Canada indicate that the Collect signal on many systems is a current reversal. While it is not clear whether this is part of the ACTS specification, it offers an explanation for the operation and success of the diode.
