= KKUP =

Community radio station in Cupertino, California

- Cupertino, California; United States
- Broadcast area: San Francisco Bay Area
- Frequency: 91.5 MHz

Programming
- Format: Variety

Ownership
- Owner: Assurance Sciences Foundation, Inc.

History
- First air date: May 1972
- Call sign meaning: "Cupertino"

Technical information
- Licensing authority: FCC
- Facility ID: 3050
- Class: B1
- ERP: 200 watts
- HAAT: 787 meters (2,582 ft)
- Transmitter coordinates: 37°06′40″N 121°50′36″W

Links
- Public license information: Public file; LMS
- Webcast: Listen Online
- Website: kkupfm.org

KKUP (91.5 FM) is a community radio station broadcasting a Variety format. Licensed to Cupertino, California, United States, it serves the San Jose section of the San Francisco Bay Area. The station is currently owned by the Assurance Science Foundation, Inc. KKUP also has a booster, KKUP-FM1, licensed to Los Gatos, California.

In 1969, Pinewood School, Los Altos had a radio station, KPSR, and returned the license to the FCC. Five college students who were working at KPSR decided to apply for the license, and start a station.

KKUP began broadcasting in May 1972. In the 1970s, one of the engineers at the station was John Draper, otherwise known as "Captain Crunch" the phone phreak. Transmitter is at Loma Prieta.

== See also ==
- List of community radio stations in the United States
