= Walter Shaw =

Walter Shaw may refer to:

- Walter L. Shaw (1917–1996), American inventor
- Walter Russell Shaw (1887–1981), Prince Edward Island politician
- Walter Shaw (judge) (1863–1937), British colonial judge and Chairman of the Shaw Commission
- Walter W. Shaw (1880–1949), American football player and coach
- Walter Shaw (British politician) (1868–1927), British Conservative Party politician
