= Ringing (telephony) =

Sound indicating an incoming call

Ringing is a telecommunication signal that causes a telephone to emit a noise (or other signal), indicating an incoming call. Historically, this entailed sending a high-voltage alternating current over the line to a customer’s telephone, which contained an electromagnetic bell. It is thus referred to as power ringing when distinguishing it from another signal, audible or tone ringing, which is sent to the caller’s handset to indicate that the recipient’s phone is in fact ringing.

== Specifications ==
In landline telephones, mechanical bells or electronic ringers are activated by impressing a 60 to 105-volt RMS sine wave (depending on manufacturer and telecoms administration) at 20 hz across the conductor pair of the subscriber line, typically represented by tip and ring, in series with the (typically) −48 VDC loop supply. This signal is produced by a ringing generator at the central office.

When the switching system directs a call to a particular subscriber line, a relay on the line card connects the ringing generator to the subscriber line. The exchange also sends a ringing tone to the calling party. When the called party answers by taking the telephone handset off the switchhook, the subscriber's telephone draws direct current from the central office battery. This current is sensed by the line card and the ringing relay is de-energized.

== Multi-party lines ==
On multi-party lines, ringers would typically be connected from one side of the two-wire line to ground; a "tip party" and "ring party" would have bells connected from opposite sides of the line. On a two-party service, each user would not hear ringing for calls to the other party. Some 20th-century independent telephone companies deployed four-party lines which used differing frequencies for selective ringing of individual parties (the four possible combinations were 20 Hz or 30 Hz from tip to ground, 20 Hz or 30 Hz from ring to ground). If additional parties were added to the same line, distinctive ringing patterns would need to be used to identify the called subscriber; these were audible to the multiple users on the line.

== Ringing generator ==
A ring generator or ringing voltage generator is a device which outputs 20 cycle sinusoidal AC at up to 110 volts peak to power bells or annunciators in one or more telephone extensions. The output stops if a handset is taken off the hook.

In terminology devised by phone phreaks, a ringing generator is a magenta box. The device can be used to simulate an incoming call by applying the AC ringing signal voltage to a POTS line to make the telephones on that line ring. A magenta box in conjunction with an orange box (which emulates the caller ID signal to create falsified data) is called a vermilion box.

The hardware also has multiple legitimate applications. While a telephone exchange includes a central source of ringing voltage at the switchboard, a private branch exchange or telephone-based intercom must provide a local source of AC ringing voltage. Theatrical performances often deploy a ringing telephone on-stage as a stage prop. An analog telephone adapter for voice over IP applications has to provide its own ringing voltage generator and other line signaling services for standard telephone extensions. The hardware may also be useful to technicians for test purposes.

Stand-alone ringing voltage generators are commercially manufactured; ring generators are also pre-built for inclusion in other telecommunications equipment and various circuits published by hobbyists to generate or detect ringing voltage for analogue telephony.

A closed system, such as an intercom or private branch exchange, need not comply with standards for ringing if it does not use standards-compliant telephone extensions. Some office telephones replace the bells with separately-wired low-voltage DC buzzers or use entirely custom-designed extensions which only work with one manufacturer's switchboard. These avoid the need to generate 20 Hz 90V sinusoidal AC, but are not compatible with standard telephone ringers.

== Ring forward and ring back ==
Ring forward is a brief signal of about 100 ms duration sent during an established connection on a trunk line between central offices by the calling operator to recall the operator at the receiving office. If the trunk line is not metallic, an equivalent on-hook condition is sent that is converted at the receiving trunk equipment to a recall signal.

In contrast to ring forward, the ring back signal is originated from the receiving or called end of a trunk line during an established connection, to recall the originating operator. The signal is also sent by a coin line operator to recall a customer at a pay station after the customer hangs up, for example to inform the customer of time and charges of the completed call.

== See also ==
- Ringtone
- Ringback tone
