= Gold box =

Gold box may refer to:

- Decorative boxes made in gold
- Gold Box, a series of video games of 1988 to 1993
- Gold box (phreaking), a phreaking box to create a bridge between two telephone lines
