= BlueBEEP =

Computer program used to exploit older telephony technology

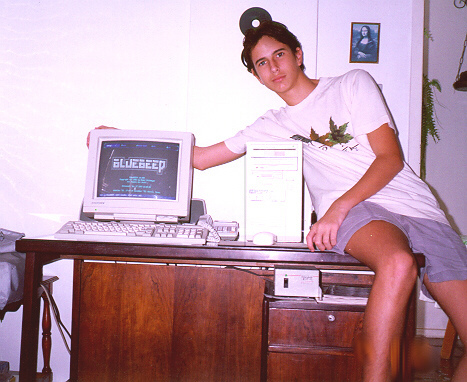
A BlueBEEP user in 1995

BlueBEEP was a popular blue boxing computer program for MS-DOS written between 1993–1995 by the German programmer Stefan Andreas Scheytt, known by the pseudonym Onkel Dittmeyer. Used correctly, it could be used to exploit vulnerabilities in the CCITT Signaling System No. 5, used by international telephone switches of this era, to make free calls around the world. The program spread via the bulletin board systems and was popular with phreaks, hackers and the warez community.

The Pascal source code was released to the public along with the final version on April 1, 1995.

BlueBEEP has been praised as "the most finely programmed phreaking tool ever coded".

The install docs report the build system as follows: "386-40 8meg with 530meg HDD and SB/16+SVGA, a Philips 102-key soft-keyboard, a 2001 canadian keyboard and a GENIUS 4-year-old shoplifted 3-button mouse."
