= Orange box =

Tool used to spoof caller ID

An orange box is a piece of hardware or software that generates caller ID frequency-shift keying (FSK) signals to spoof caller ID information on the target's caller ID terminal. Phreakers typically use them and other phreaking boxes to perform their attacks.

== See also ==
- Blue box
- Mult box
