= TAP (magazine) =

American underground phone-phreaking newsletter (1971–1984)

- June 1976 issue of TAP No. 36
- Editor: Tom Edison; Cheshire Catalyst (Ozzie Osband)
- Former editors: Al Bell (Alan Fierstein)
- Categories: Phone phreaking, computer hacking, telecommunications
- Frequency: Bimonthly
- Format: Newsletter (folded tabloid)
- Founder: Abbie Hoffman, Al Bell (Alan Fierstein)
- First issue: June 1971
- Final issue Number: March 1984; 91
- Country: United States
- Based in: New York City
- Language: English
- ISSN: 0194-3936
- OCLC: 11801135

TAP (originally YIPL, Youth International Party Line) was an American underground newsletter focused on phone phreaking and related technical topics. It was published from 1971 to 1984.

It was co-founded in June 1971 by Abbie Hoffman and Alan Fierstein (writing as Al Bell), a Cornell engineering student. Early issues mixed Yippie political commentary with technical information about the Bell System.

In 1973 the publication was renamed TAP, initially standing for Technological American Party and later Technological Assistance Program. It continued as a technical newsletter covering telephone signaling, network architecture, and related electronics until it ceased in 1984.
