= Volkswriter =

Word processing software

- Leaflet of version 2.2
- Developer: Camilo Wilson / Lifetree Software
- Initial release: 1982; 44 years ago
- Operating system: MS-DOS, OS-9
- Type: Word processor
- License: Commercial proprietary software

Volkswriter is a word processor for IBM PC compatibles written by Camilo Wilson. It was distributed by Lifetree Software beginning in 1982.

== Description ==
Camilo Wilson was an author and computer consultant who, in 1981, planned to use the new IBM PC to write a book about the computer. One of the first to receive it in California, he purchased IBM's EasyWriter word processor—a launch title for the PC—and later said that its "horrors ... were such that I decided to write my own ... to get the book done". After writing the new application in Pascal in less than four months Wilson borrowed $15,000 to market it, and formed Lifetree Software with his girlfriend, Honey Williams. Volkswriter debuted at the spring 1982 West Coast Computer Faire and, as Plainwriter, in a small listing in the first issue of PC Magazine. By the next issue Lifetree described the renamed Volkswriter in a full-page advertisement as "a high performance word processor" with which "you cannot erase data unintentionally".

EasyWriter was so poor in quality that Volkswriter was for a while, as Andrew Fluegelman wrote in late 1982, "the only fully functioning word processor available for the PC". To compete with WordStar, which appeared on the PC six weeks after Volkswriter, Wilson emphasized its ease of use. By early 1984 Lifetree had 40,000 customers, $2 million in sales—about half to companies—27 employees, and released an enhanced $295 Volkswriter Deluxe, also ported to the Atari ST running OS-9 and, as GEM Write, to GEM.

Lifetree revenue rose to $5 million, before declining to $2 million in 1988 and $592,000 in 1989. The company published Volkswriter until May 1989, when, due to profitability problems, Wilson decided to discontinue all products except Correct Grammar, a grammar checker. The Volkswriter product line was sold to employees, who formed Volkswriter Inc. WordStar International agreed to acquire Lifetree in February 1991; the latter company had $4 million in sales in 1990.

== Reception ==
A 1988 PC Magazine reader survey found that 2% used Volkswriter.

Fluegelman of PC wrote in 1982 that "Like the inspiration for its name, VW doesn't go in for a lot of frills but performs essential functions very well". Although criticizing the lack of headers or footers, he stated "If I needed to have a novice using a word processor within an hour, Volkswriter would be my choice". In a 1983 review of several IBM PC word processors, BYTE described Volkswriter as "simple in design ... quite straightforward to use for minor writing projects ... just enough features to get most jobs done". It noted Volkswriter's ability to run on a 64K computer and that it had the lowest price, $195, but advised those who primarily used their computers for word processing to consider other options.

SoftSide in 1983 said that Volkswriter was "by far the easiest of the IBM word processors to use", and would serve most home and business users. While criticizing the obscurity of printer setup, and the function keys-oriented user interface ("Having twenty function keys doesn't mean you have to use all of them"), the magazine concluded that "With a little practice, you can become proficient, and Volkswriter will perform well for you".John V. Lombardi of InfoWorld said in 1984 that Volkswriter Deluxe "approaches the standards of top" programs like WordStar. He approved of its "flexible and powerful" formatting, and said that the amount of possible customization made it "invaluable for specialized application", but criticized the lack of documentation for printer configuration.

In a 1987 review of low-cost word processors, PC said "Volkswriter Deluxe Plus is one of the best ... available at any price, which in this case is a paltry $99". The magazine approved of its configurability, tutorial and manual, and speed, "excellent" WYSIWYG, and UI similarity to Volkswriter 3.

Compute! in 1991 approved of Volkswriter 4's ease of use and ability to import WordStar, WordPerfect, and Microsoft Word files. Citing the 30-day money-back warranty, the magazine said "you can't lose. This word processor truly puts the power of words into the hands of the people".

== Bibliography ==
- 'Volkswriter 3' Is Word-processing Program Not Likely To Be Outgrown, February 2, 1986 Author:Henry Kisor] (AP article, this copy from the Orlando Sentinel)
- Volkswriter 3 review by Paul Schindler of Computer Chronicles, 16 February 1986
- Volkswriter Scientific: Simple, But Not Quite Complete NEW PRODUCTS by David Chan The Scientist 1987-10-19, 1(23):20.
