= EasyWriter =

Word processor

- Original author: John Draper
- Release: 1979; 47 years ago
- Written in: Forth
- Operating system: Apple II, IBM PC
- Type: Word processor
- Website: "Beyond The Little Blue Box". Archived from the original on 2022-12-20.

EasyWriter was the first word processor for the Apple II. It was written by John Draper and released in 1979.

== History ==
Published by Information Unlimited Software (IUS), it was written by John Draper's Cap'n Software, which also produced a version of Forth, which EasyWriter was developed in. Draper developed EasyWriter while serving nights in the Alameda County Jail under a work furlough program.

It was later ported to the IBM PC and released with the new computer in August 1981 as a launch title. Many criticized EasyWriter 1.0, distributed by IBM, for being buggy and hard to use; PC Magazine told the company as early as December 1981 that subscribers "wish IBM had provided better word processing". The company quickly persuaded IUS to develop a new version. (When founder William Baker later sent "I Survived EasyWriter" T-shirts, IBM returned them stating that it did not accept gifts.) IBM offered a free upgrade to version 1.10 to version 1.0 owners, but EasyWriter's poor quality had caused others to quickly provide alternatives, such as Camilo Wilson's Volkswriter.

IUS released a separate application, EasyWriter II. Completely rewritten by Basic Software Group, IUS described it as a more "professional" word processor. The company emphasized that II—developed with C instead of Forth—"is not an updated version of the original IBM selection or its upgrade".

== Reception ==
BYTE in 1981 reviewed EasyWriter and EasyWriter Professional for the Apple II, stating that "editing is a pleasure with either version", and approving of their features, user interface, and documentation. In an early review of the IBM PC, however, the magazine in 1982 stated that EasyWriter for it or the Apple II "didn't seem to be of the same caliber as, say, VisiCalc or the Peachtree business packages", citing the lack of ease of use and slow scrolling as flaws, and advised those who planned to use the IBM PC primarily for word processing to buy another computer until alternative software became available. Andrew Fluegelman wrote in PC Magazine that year that although EasyWriter 1.0 appeared to be an easy-to-use word processor for casual users, it "contains a few very annoying inconveniences and some very serious traps". He cited several bugs, slow performance, and user-interface issues, and later called it "pretty much a lemon". Fluegelman said in 1985 that the review had become notorious, as he was a novice computer user and "no one knew who I was, I didn't know anybody, I just took this program and I said 'This is terrible'", but "it deserved panning".

IBM's Don Estridge admitted in 1983 that he "tried to use EasyWriter 1.0 and had the same experience everybody else had". EasyWriter 1.10 resolved most of Fluegelman's complaints. He reported that it "performs smoothly, will handle most any routine writing and printing job, and is easy to learn and operate", and that if IBM had released 1.10 first EasyWriter would likely have become the standard PC word processor.

BYTE criticized EasyWriter II for running as a booter instead of using DOS, requiring specially formatted disks for storage and a utility to convert to DOS-formatted disks, not being compatible with double-sided drives, and using a heavily modal editing interface.

== See also ==
- List of word processors
