= Joybubbles =

American phone phreak (1949-2007)

- Joybubbles in 2005
- Born: Josef Carl Engressia Jr. 25 May 1949; Richmond, Virginia, United States
- Died: 8 August 2007 (aged 58); Minneapolis, Minnesota, United States
- Other names: Whistler, Highrise Joe
- Education: University of South Florida (degree in Philosophy)
- Occupations: Former phreaker, amateur radio operator, ordained minister
- Years active: 1960s–2007
- Organization(s): Church of Eternal Childhood, We Won't Grow Up
- Known for: Pioneering phone phreaking with 2600 Hz whistle, founder of Church of Eternal Childhood
- Notable work: "Stories and Stuff" telephone line, "Zzzzyzzerrific Funline"
- Call sign: WB0RPA

Joybubbles (May 25, 1949 – August 8, 2007), born Josef Carl Engressia Jr. in Richmond, Virginia, was an early phone phreak. Born blind, he became interested in telephones at age four. He had absolute pitch, and was able to whistle 2600 hertz — an operator tone also used by blue box phreaking devices — into a telephone. Joybubbles said that he had an IQ of "172 or something".

== Early life ==
Joybubbles was born Josef Carl Engressia Jr. in Richmond, Virginia to Joe Sr. and Esther. He had a younger sister, Toni, who is also blind. The Engressia family moved often. Joybubbles grew up all over the East Coast, including an apartment in Richmond where he developed his phreaking skills, briefly in Saugus, Massachusetts and all around Florida, including Fort Lauderdale, Florida, Pompano Beach, Florida, and finally Miami, Florida. Joybubbles had good relationships with his mom and sister, but his father was abusive.

In his youth, Joybubbles had a unique interest in textures and sounds, including Jell-O, shower curtains, the telephone, and whistling, which he would develop a talent for.

== Whistler ==
External audio
- "Long Distance" – A Radiolab program about Joybubbles, phreaking, and telephony; featuring historian and author Phil Lapsley. (Archived from the original)
- "A Call From Joybubbles" – BBC Radio 4 program about Joybubbles and phreaking. Includes extensive telephonic soundscapes. Featuring documentarian Rachael Morrison, historian Phil Lapsely, John Draper, various phone phreaks, and acquaintances of Joybubbles.

As a five-year-old, Joybubbles discovered he could dial phone numbers by clicking the hang-up switch rapidly ("tapping"). At the age of seven, he was idly whistling along to clicks while on the phone, he accidentally discovered that at certain frequencies, he could activate phone switches.

A student at the University of South Florida in the late 1960s, he was given the nickname "Whistler" due to his ability to place free long-distance phone calls by whistling the proper tones with his mouth. After a Canadian operator reported him for selling such calls for $1 at the university, he was suspended and fined $25 but soon reinstated. He graduated with a degree in philosophy and moved to Tennessee.

== Later life ==
In 1982, he moved to Minneapolis, Minnesota. He lived on his Social Security disability pension and a job as a test subject for scent-intensity research. He was an ordained minister of his own Church of Eternal Childhood, and ran a one-man nonprofit support organization for people rediscovering and re-experiencing childhood, called "We Won't Grow Up". He tried to remain an active member of the children's community around his home, giving readings at the local library and setting up phone calls to terminally ill children around the world. He often contributed to the Bulletin Board section of the St. Paul Pioneer Press newspaper.

Sexually abused as a child by one of his teachers, Joybubbles "reverted to his childhood" in May 1988 and remained there until his death, claiming that he was five years old. He legally changed his name to Joybubbles in 1991, stating that he wanted to put his past, specifically the abuse, behind him. He was listed in the local phone directory as "Joybubbles, I Am".

An avid fan of Mister Rogers, Joybubbles was mentioned in a November 1998 Esquire magazine article about children's television host Fred Rogers. In the summer of 1998, Joybubbles traveled to the University of Pittsburgh's Mister Rogers' Neighborhood Archives and watched several hundred episodes over a span of six weeks.

An active amateur radio operator with the call sign WB0RPA, he held an amateur extra class license, the highest grade issued. As shown in the Federal Communications Commission database, he also earned both a general radiotelephone operator license and a commercial radiotelegraph operator's license, as well as a ship radar endorsement on these certificates. He was one of the few to qualify for the now-obsolete aircraft radiotelegraph endorsement on the latter license.

== Presence in the media ==
- In 1971, just after his arrest, Joybubbles was featured in an Esquire article by Ron Rosenbaum which exposed the phone phreak scene to a general public and led to further media coverage of Joybubbles, who became a cultural icon.
- The 1992 movie Sneakers had a character called "Whistler", who seemed to combine traits of both Joybubbles and John Draper. The character is played by David Strathairn.
- The 2001 documentary film The Secret History of Hacking features archive footage of Joybubbles.
- In Steve Wozniak's book iWoz, Steve Wozniak mentions Joybubbles as an early inspiration during his college years.
- On February 21, 2012, WNYC's Radiolab aired a segment on Joybubbles in an episode titled "Escape!"
- Chapter 9 of the book Exploding the Phone by Phil Lapsley details his successful plan to get a job by purposely getting arrested for phreaking.
- Phone phreaking and specifically Joybubbles were the subject of "A Call from Joybubbles", broadcast on BBC Radio 4, on March 13, 2017 and March 17, 2018.
- Joybubbles is the subject of the eponymous 2026 documentary Joybubbles.

== Phone services ==
Joybubbles ran a weekly telephone story line called "Stories and Stuff", which was usually updated during the weekend.

In the early and mid-1980s, he ran a phone line called the "Zzzzyzzerrific Funline", which had the distinction of being the very last entry in the phone book. During the Zzzzyzzerrific Funline days, calling himself Highrise Joe, he would go on various rants about how much he loved Valleyfair amusement park and would also regularly play and discuss Up with People.
