= Silver box =

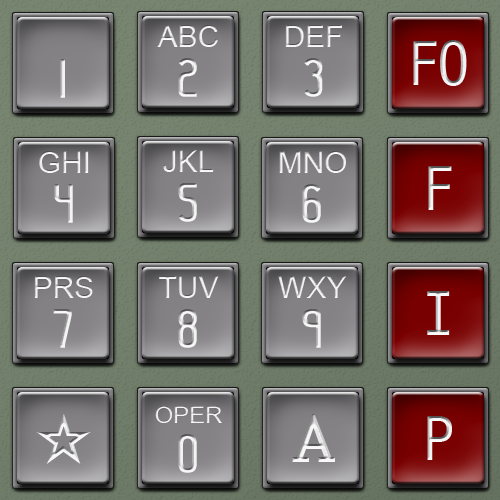
A diagram of an Autovon telephone keypad with the four precedence levels

A silver box is a modified DTMF keypad that adds four additional keys. This gives four columns of four keys each (16 total) instead of three columns (in the standard 12-pushbutton handset).

In the now-obsolete Autovon phone system these keys, used to set priority of a military call, were the red buttons in the photo on the right. Autovon included four precedence levels: Routine (no special tone), Priority (D), Immediate (C) and Flash (B) with Flash Override (A) as a capability. Each had the ability to interrupt lower-priority calls in progress if all trunks were busy. Each was activated using a button in an additional column of the keypad:

- A (697+1633 Hz): Flash Override (FO)
- B (770+1633 Hz): Flash (F)
- C (852+1633 Hz): Immediate (I)
- D (941+1633 Hz): Priority (P)

Autovon was replaced in the early 1990s by the Defense Switched Network; much of its infrastructure is now dismantled. Amateur radio equipment continues to be manufactured with 16-key DTMF keypads, keeping extra tones available for on-air use to control remote apparatus such as radio repeater stations. These tone pairs (labelled A, B, C, D) are rarely used.

Conversion of twelve-button keypads was usually accomplished with the addition of a toggle switch and a crystal that switched one column of a standard phone keypad into the "fourth column" used to generate 1633 Hz as the higher of the two tones output on a keypress.

Modern phones with an integrated circuit based DTMF generator can frequently be modified by simply soldering a wire from the 1633 Hz leg to a switch that toggles between that leg and the 1477 Hz leg for the rightmost column of keys.
