= Gold box (phreaking) =

The gold box is a phreaking box whose function is to create a bridge between two telephone lines. In its basic operation, the user calls one of the lines, the gold box answers and connects the two lines together, yielding the dial tone of the second line to the user. The user can then place calls from the second line which are billed (and traced) to that line.

The gold box can be considered a hardware version of a diverter, which is a fixed form of call forwarding. However, while the diverter is a service offered to customers by the telephone company, the Gold Box is usually installed illegally and used to place long distance or annoyance calls at the expense (and liability) of the owner of the affected lines.
