= Operation Cybersnare =

1995 operation targeted at computer hackers

- Venue: Online (Bulletin Board System "Celco 51")
- Type: Sting operation, Cybercrime
- Target: Computer hackers sellers of stolen data
- Participants: United States Secret Service
- Outcome: Arrests of six individuals, breakup of a cell phone fraud ring, seizure of computer systems and illicit devices.
- Property damage: Millions of dollars' worth of data stolen.
- Arrests: 6
- Charges: Computer fraud cell phone fraud, theft of personal information.

Operation Cybersnare was a sting operation by United States Secret Service targeted at computer hackers. This was the first undercover Internet sting of its kind. Elaborate ruses were designed by law enforcement agencies to trap computer criminals. The operation lasted for 8 months.

The sting resulted in arrests of six individuals and the breakup of a sophisticated cell phone fraud ring. These individuals stole millions of dollars' worth of data.

== History ==
In January 1995, the Secret Service set up an undercover bulletin board system called “Celco 51” in Bergen County, New Jersey. It was a forum for the purchase of stolen cellular phone access numbers, credit card numbers and personal identity information. An agent served as the board’s operator using the computer moniker “Carder One”.

The undercover agents advertised this bulletin board as "catering to individuals involved in unauthorized computer intrusion and all aspects of computer fraud, including cellular telephone fraud."

In September 1995, Individuals who stole and offered illicit products for sale in the group were identified and arrested. Twelve raids across the country resulted in the arrest of six hackers. More than 30 systems were seized. It also led to the confiscation of 65 illegally programmed phones and 14 readers.

== Arrests ==
- Richard Lacap or Chillin, of Katy, Texas, was charged with conspiring to break into the computer system of an Oregon Cellular Telephone company.
- Kevin Watkins or Led, of Houston, Texas, was charged conspiring to break into the computer system of an Oregon Cellular Telephone company.
- Jeremy Golle Cushing or Alpha Bits, of Huntington Beach, California, was charged with trafficking cloned cellular telephone equipment and stolen access devices used to program cellular telephones.
- Frank Natoli or Mmind, of Brooklyn, New York, was charged with trafficking in stolen access devices used to program cellular telephones.
- Al Bradford or Cellfone, of Detroit, Michigan, was charged with trafficking in unauthorized access devices used to program cellular telephones.
- Michael Clarkson or Barcode, of Brooklyn, New York, was charged with possessing and trafficking in hardware used to obtain unauthorized access to telecommunications services.
