= Infinity transmitter =

Surveillance device

An infinity transmitter (also known as a harmonica bug) is a surveillance device used to covertly monitor conversation in a room through a telephone line. Its name derives from the fact that, by using a telephone line as a transmitter, it can work at an infinite distance, unlike other bugging devices that have only a finite signal range. The alternative name 'harmonica bug' refers to the fact that such devices were originally activated using the tone produced by a harmonica.

Design of infinity transmitters has varied, according to developments in telephone systems. In some instances, the bug is activated after the target answers and hangs up their phone. In countries where there is a delay between connection and the first ring, the bug can be activated before the target phone rings, so that the infinity transmitter essentially 'answers' the call. In more advanced systems, the transmitter can be placed in a parallel telephone line to prevent the victim's phone line remaining engaged. As modern telephone lines no longer establish a voice path until the call is answered a variant of this now exists that uses CND, or caller ID. Usually an unusual sequence of non printing characters is used and thus will not show up on a display device. Sometimes the caller ID device itself has the bug but it can be nearly anywhere. In much the same manner a cellphone can be configured for silence on ring and auto answer and hidden, frequently placed inside something that has power available to maintain the battery. This allows the infinity transmitter to be hidden inside an automobile or other location where a land line is not an option.
