= Walter L. Shaw =

American telecommunications engineer and inventor

- Born: December 20, 1916; Vineland, New Jersey, United States
- Died: July 21, 1996 (aged 79); Fort Lauderdale, Florida, United States
- Occupations: Telecommunications engineer, inventor

Walter L. Shaw Sr. (December 20, 1916, in Vineland, New Jersey – July 21, 1996) was an American telecommunications engineer and inventor who clashed with his employer (variously identified as AT&T, Bell and Southern Bell) over ownership of his inventions. As a result, he quit and eventually ended up supplying the Mafia with black boxes capable of making free and untraceable telephone calls. In 1976, he was convicted of "illegal phone usage" and sent to prison.

== Biography ==
He was born on December 20, 1916, in Vineland, New Jersey, to Amanda and Edward Shaw.

Shaw went to work for AT&T or Bell or Southern Bell in 1935. In his spare time, he invented things, eventually obtaining 39 patents. His inventions or inventions based on his patents include: the speakerphone, call forwarding, conference calling and the answering machine. In 1954, he was asked by President Dwight D. Eisenhower to create the Moscow–Washington hotline, the "red telephone" connecting the two superpowers. When his bosses repeatedly tried to get him to sign over the rights to his inventions and patents, he quit after 14 years on the job.

Since his former employer enjoyed a telephone monopoly in the United States, he was unsuccessful in reaping any rewards from his inventions, until he became involved with the Mafia. He devised a black box to make free, untraceable long distance telephone calls, which was a boon for bookmaking and other criminal activities. He was called to testify before the United States Senate Permanent Subcommittee on Investigations in 1961 and again in 1971. Shaw was convicted in 1976 on eight counts of "illegal phone usage".

His son, Walter T. Shaw Jr., became embittered by the treatment accorded his father. He left home at the age of 16 and became a prolific jewel thief, credited with over 2000 robberies, before reforming. After serving 11 years in prison, Shaw Jr. reconciled with his father.

Walter L. Shaw died of prostate cancer on July 21, 1996, in Fort Lauderdale, Florida.

== Legacy ==
Steve Wozniak and Steve Jobs built and sold blue boxes which worked like Shaw's black box to provide free telephone calls, which has led some sources to presume a connection. As Jobs would later comment, "If it hadn’t been for the blue boxes, there wouldn’t have been an Apple".

In 2002, it was announced that Ben Kingsley would star in All or Nothin', a crime drama about Walter L. Shaw and his son, though the project never materialized.

Shaw Jr. produced Genius on Hold, a 2013 documentary film about his father.
