= John Draper =

American computer programmer and former phone phreak

John Thomas Draper
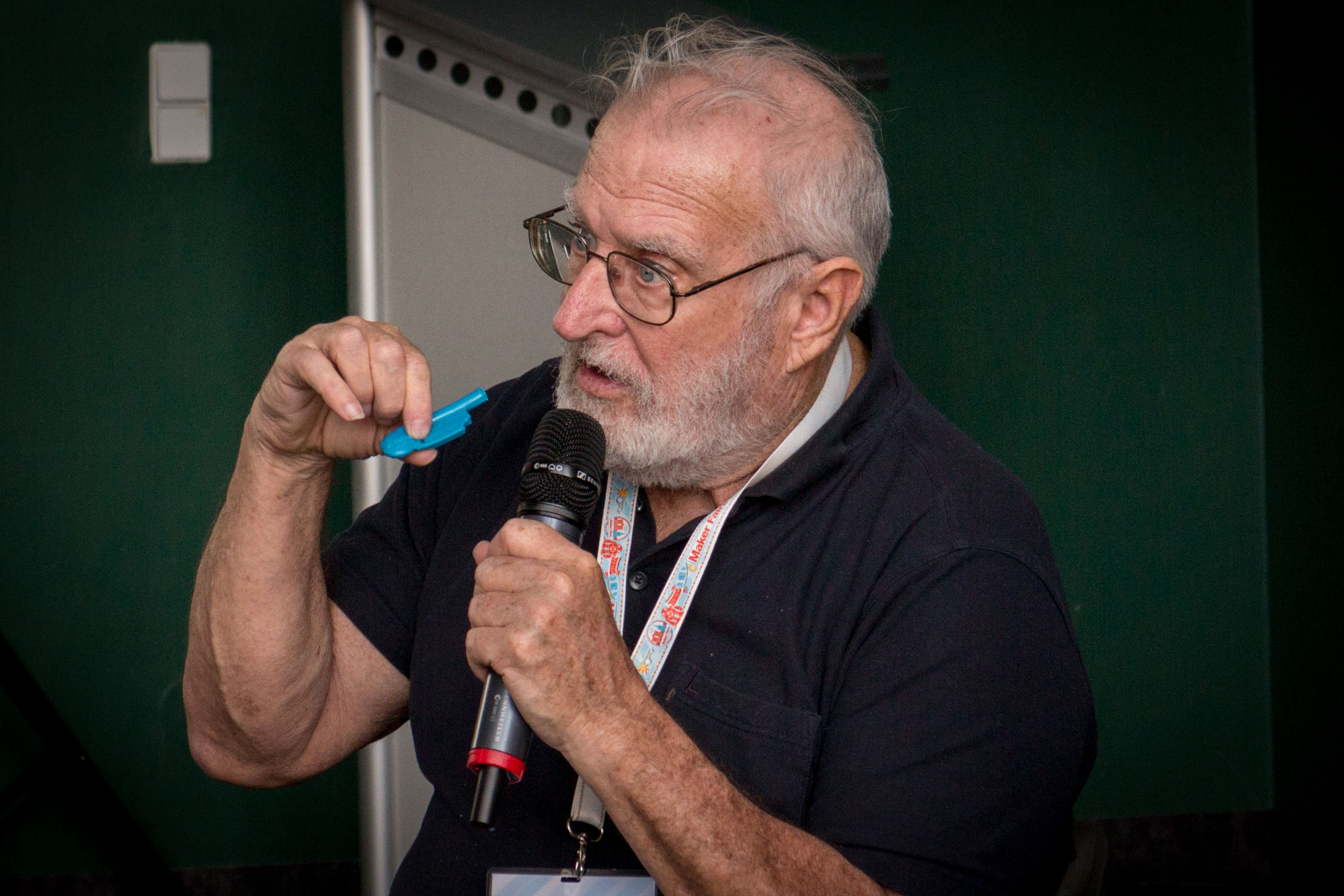
- Draper at Maker Faire Berlin, 2015
- Born: John Thomas Draper; March 11, 1943 (age 83)
- Other names: Captain Crunch; Crunchman; Crunch
- Occupations: Computer programmer; Former phone phreak
- Website: https://johndraper.us/ www.webcrunchers.com & www.crunchcreations.com/

John Thomas Draper (also known as Captain Crunch, Crunch, or Crunchman; born March 11, 1943) is an American computer programmer and former phone phreak. He is a widely known figure within the hacker and computer security community. He is primarily known as a colorful and unconventional figure in Silicon Valley history and lore. He befriended and influenced Steve Wozniak and Steve Jobs in the years before they founded Apple Computer. His determined probing and exploration of the telephone network earned him a reputation for his technical acumen. However, his activities sometimes crossed legal lines, leading to criminal charges and prison time for toll fraud.

In the 1970s and 1980s, he worked as a software engineer for Apple and Autodesk and briefly ran his own software company, producing the EasyWriter word processor. He later worked on computer security and media-delivery technologies, serving as chief technical officer of ShopIP from 1999 to 2004 and becoming chief technical officer of En2go in 2007.

== Early life ==
Draper is the son of a United States Air Force engineer. As a child, he built a home radio station from discarded military components. He was frequently bullied in school and briefly received psychological treatment.

Draper enlisted in the U.S. Air Force in 1964. While stationed in Alaska, he helped his fellow service members make free phone calls home by devising access to a local telephone switchboard. In 1967, while stationed at Charleston Air Force Station in Maine, he created WKOS (W-"chaos"), a pirate radio station based in nearby Dover-Foxcroft, Maine.

Following his honorable discharge from the Air Force as an airman first class in 1968, he moved to San Jose, California. He worked briefly for National Semiconductor as an engineering technician and at Hugle International, where he worked on early designs for a cordless telephone. He also attended De Anza College part-time through 1972. During this period, he also worked as an engineer and disc jockey for KKUP in Cupertino, California.

== Career ==
=== Phreaking ===
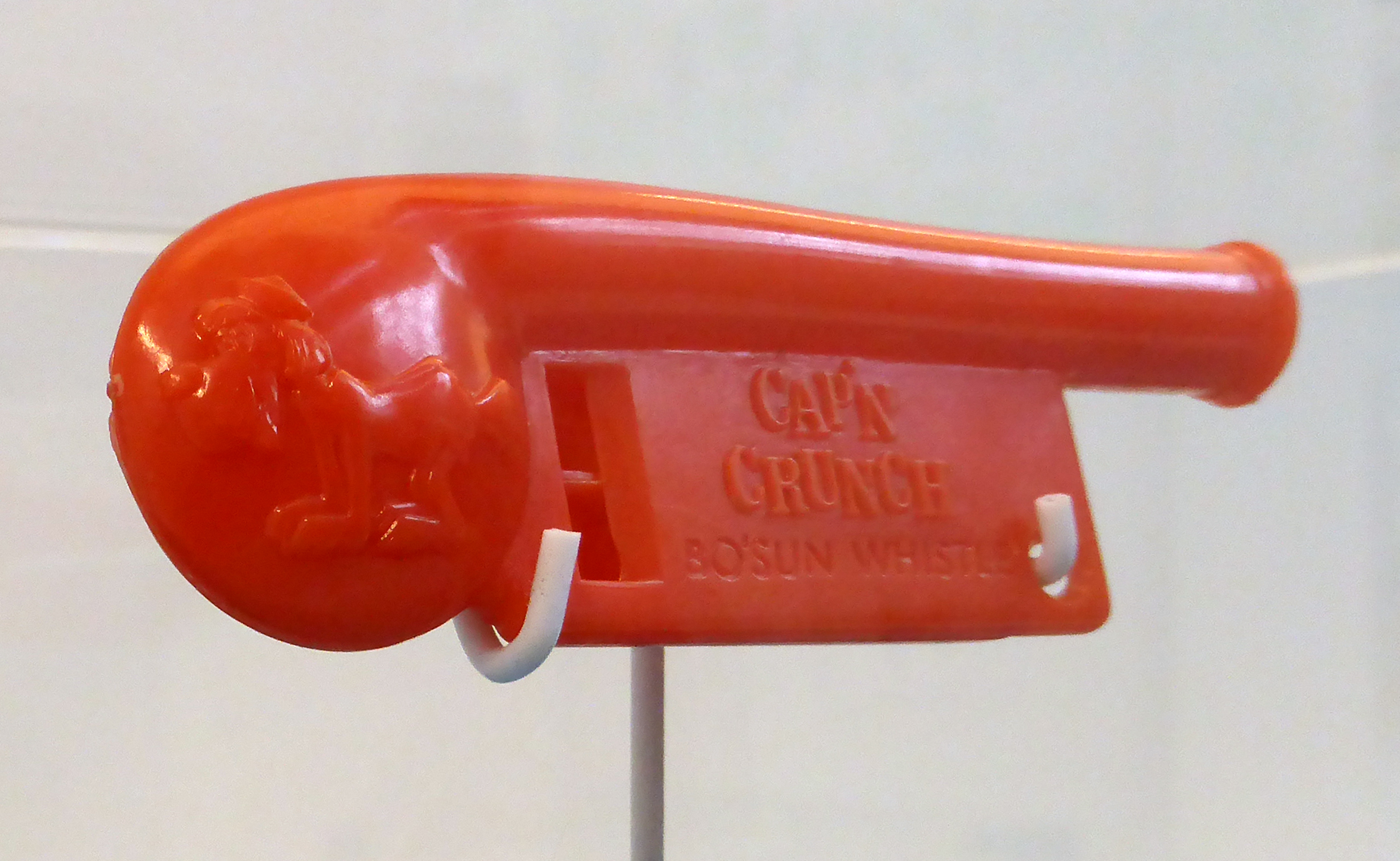
A Cap'n Crunch boatswain's pipe

Draper was introduced to the world of phone phreaking in 1969 by Denny Teresi, who, like Draper, was a pirate radio broadcaster. Accounts of how their first meeting came about differ in the retelling. Sometime after his discharge from the Air Force and while he was living in San Jose, Draper received a phone call from Teresi, a blind teenager living in a San Jose suburb. In one version, the call came after Draper had broadcast his phone number seeking feedback from listeners. In another version, the call was a chance wrong number dialed by Teresi that resulted in a conversation. Whatever the circumstances, that call led to Draper seeking Teresi out and ultimately meeting him at his home in the San Jose suburbs. Teresi told Draper about a network of friends who called themselves phone phreaks, many of whom were also blind. Using cassette tape recordings and a Farfisa electric organ to replicate electronic tones used to control it, they explored the phone network to understand how it worked and to make free long-distance calls. Among the group of friends was Joseph Engressia, who went by the moniker Joybubbles, who had perfect pitch and could whistle precisely the 2600 hertz tone used by AT&T to indicate that a trunk line was available to make a call. Gathering around clusters of payphones, they would play the tones into the receiver and explore the network, calling distant locations for free.

Draper learned from Teresi that a toy whistle packaged in boxes of Cap'n Crunch cereal in 1963 emitted a 2600-hertz tone. The discovery that the toy whistle could be used to generate the telephone network's 2600-hertz control tone was made by a Los Angeles-based phone phreaker who used the pseudonym Sid Bernay. The tone disconnected one end of a trunk while the still-connected side entered operator mode. The vulnerability was limited to call-routing switches that relied on in-band signaling.

Learning of Draper's knowledge of electronic design, Teresi and other phreakers asked him to build a multifrequency tone generator, known informally as a blue box, capable of generating the 2600-hertz tone and other tones used to control the telephone network. Draper built a crude electronic blue box and subsequently designed a more sophisticated version. By 1970, the phreaking hobby had spread, and its enthusiasts had begun gathering regularly on a conference call-like system they called 2111. The name came from a misconfigured teletype switching machine in British Columbia designed for connecting multiple teletype lines at once. The phreakers discovered that if they called the number at the same time, they would all be connected, creating a primitive conference call. During one of these calls, Draper adopted the moniker Captain Crunch, inspired by the toy whistle.

As telephone networks transitioned from in-band signaling to common-channel signaling systems such as Signalling System No. 7, blue boxes and 2600-hertz whistles ceased to work on upgraded portions of the network. The whistles subsequently became collectible souvenirs of the phone-phreaking era, and the magazine 2600: The Hacker Quarterly, founded in 1984, was named after the tone.

==== Profile by Esquire ====
In 1971, journalist Ron Rosenbaum wrote about phone phreaking for Esquire. The article relied heavily on interviews with Draper and conferred upon him a sort of celebrity status among people interested in the counterculture. Reflecting on the reporting of the story years later, Rosenbaum described Draper as determined to make himself the central character in it. Draper frequently interrupted phone calls between Rosenbaum and other phreaks as a way of demonstrating his technical abilities. "All throughout it, during the reporting of the story, he was injecting himself into the story. It was fairly clear that, with some justice, he considered himself if not the star, certainly a star in the phone phreak firmament."

In one interview with Rosenbaum, Draper explained his prevailing ethos concerning phone phreaking:

I don't do that. I don't do that anymore at all. And if I do it, I do it for one reason and one reason only. I'm learning about a system. The phone company is a System. A computer is a System, do you understand? If I do what I do, it is only to explore a system. Computers, systems—that's my bag. The phone company is nothing but a computer.

— Secrets of the Little Blue Box, Ron Rosenbaum, Esquire Magazine (October 1971) as republished by Slate

The article caught the attention of Steve Wozniak, then an engineering student at the University of California, Berkeley. After reading about Draper and phone phreaking, Wozniak contacted Draper and arranged to meet him at KKUP, where Draper was working as an engineer. Wozniak brought his friend Steve Jobs to the meeting, and the three compared techniques for building blue boxes. Wozniak and Jobs subsequently built and sold blue boxes themselves.

==== Criminal cases and cooperation with FBI ====
The notoriety of the Esquire article led to Draper's arrest by the FBI in May 1972 on seven counts of fraud by wire. The charges stemmed from illegal long-distance and international calls to New York and Oklahoma, and a phone number answering service in Sydney, Australia, that played a recorded message listing that country's most popular songs. After pleading no contest he was given a suspended sentence of one year in prison, a $1,000 fine and five years probation. Under the terms of his probation, he was forbidden to share his technical knowledge for building blue boxes and making free calls. Draper's activities during this period were later documented by journalist Steven Levy in his 1984 book Hackers: Heroes of the Computer Revolution, which profiled Draper among the figures associated with the development of early hacker culture.

Following that conviction, Draper remained under FBI surveillance. In 1975, while visiting New York City, he told Chic Eder, a friend who was also an FBI informant, that phone phreakers had learned how to use telephone-company technology to eavesdrop on calls and claimed to have done so on lines belonging to the FBI's San Francisco field office. Eder, a longtime drug dealer, offered to provide evidence against Draper in exchange for parole and money. He traveled to California with Draper to purchase a blue box and encouraged Draper to demonstrate the interception of an FBI call, recording the demonstration. FBI investigators, working with telephone-company engineers, subsequently replicated the technique. The episode led to Draper's indictment on two charges of toll fraud.

His sentence of four months at the federal prison in Lompoc, California, made him the first phone phreak to spend time in federal prison. As part of a plea deal, he agreed to cooperate with the FBI by explaining phone system vulnerabilities, how to exploit them, and how to fix them.

In 1978, Draper pled guilty to one count of possession of a device to steal telecommunications services and was sentenced to three to six months in a Pennsylvania jail. The conviction violated the terms of his federal parole. He returned to California to face the impact of his parole violations. He underwent two psychiatric evaluations which found that "Draper tend[s] to pass himself off as the victim claiming that he has almost no control over all of the troubles that now beset him", and that he had "numerous paranoid delusions" concerning being singled out for persecution because of his knowledge about the phone system. In March of 1979, he was sentenced to spend one year in a work furlough program. He spent nights in the Alameda County jail, where he wrote computer code on paper, and days entering it into an Apple II. The result was EasyWriter.

=== Hardware and software developer ===
==== Homebrew Computer Club ====
Draper was involved with the Homebrew Computer Club during its early months. Founded in 1975, the club brought together computer hobbyists, engineers, and entrepreneurs in the San Francisco Bay Area to exchange technical information, software, and hardware designs during the emergence of personal computing. Its participants included Steve Wozniak, who demonstrated the Apple-1 there, Steve Jobs, and Lee Felsenstein, who became the club's moderator and later designed the Sol-20 and Osborne 1 computers.

In June 1975, the club's newsletter credited Draper with establishing a group library account at Call Computer, intended to give members shared access to useful programs.

==== Apple Computer and the Charley Board ====
Draper's association with Steve Wozniak predated both the Homebrew Computer Club and the founding of Apple. Wozniak recalled seeing Draper use a teletype to connect to ARPANET and play chess with a computer in Boston. The demonstration inspired Wozniak to build a television terminal capable of communicating with remote computers. He later incorporated a microprocessor into the design, an important step in the development of the computer that became the Apple-1.

In 1977, Draper worked for Apple as an independent contractor, and was assigned by Wozniak to develop a device that could connect the Apple II computer to phone lines. Wozniak said he thought computers could act like an answering machine, and modems were not yet widely available. Draper designed an interface device dubbed the "Charley Board", which was designed to dial toll-free telephone numbers used by many corporations and to emit touch tones that would grant access to the WATS lines in use by those companies. In theory, this would allow unlimited and free long-distance phone calls. Upon learning of the Charley Board's capabilities, Apple's CEO Mike Scott canceled the project immediately. Some of its techniques were later used in tone-activated calling menus, voicemail, and other services.

"It was an incredible board. But no one at Apple liked Crunch. Only me. They wouldn't let his device become a product," Wozniak said of the episode in 2004.

==== EasyWriter ====
While on a work-release program during his third period of incarceration in 1979, Draper wrote EasyWriter, the first word processor for the Apple II. Draper had previously developed an implementation of the Forth programming language for the Apple II, and later said that the need to document his Forth compiler helped motivate him to develop the word processor. EasyWriter was written using Forth and assembly language. He was also inspired in part by Electric Pencil, an early word processor. Draper later ported EasyWriter to the IBM PC after a demonstration of it at a computer fair caught the attention of the founders of Information Unlimited Software, a small software company based in Marin County.

Draper subsequently developed EasyWriter Professional, which expanded the Apple II version to support an 80-character display and lowercase text. The software debuted at the Minneapolis Word Processor show in the summer of 1980, where exhibitors also included Wang, DEC, and IBM. The IBM PC version of EasyWriter was subsequently selected as the machine's official word processor after IBM failed to reach a deal with MicroPro International for WordStar. While the original was popular with Apple II users, the IBM port was poorly received by customers. IBM was forced to offer free updates.

Following his release, Draper and Matthew McIntosh formed Cap'n Software to continue development of Draper's Forth implementation and EasyWriter. The company booked less than $1 million in revenue over six years. Distributor Bill Baker hired other programmers to create a follow-up program, EasyWriter II, without Draper's knowledge. Draper sued and the case was later settled out-of-court.

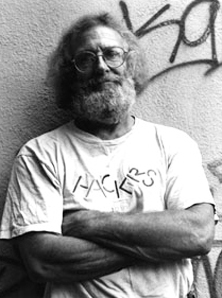
John Draper in Canberra, Australia, 1995

==== Autodesk and other ventures ====
Draper worked as a programmer for Autodesk during the 1980s. According to Draper, he joined the company in 1986 after being offered a position by Autodesk co-founder John Walker, and worked on video-driver software. In 1987, Draper was charged in a scheme to forge tickets for the Bay Area Rapid Transit system. He pled guilty to lesser misdemeanor charges in 1988 and entered a diversion program. During the investigation, an Apollo workstation containing AutoCAD source code was seized from Draper's apartment. Draper later said that he remained on Autodesk's payroll while facing prosecution but performed no work for the company before being dismissed the following year.

From 1999 to 2004, Draper was the chief technical officer for ShopIP, a computer security firm that developed the CrunchBox, a network security appliance based on OpenBSD. The system incorporated the Snort intrusion-detection system together with custom-written heuristics intended to identify new exploits. In 2002, Draper made a public version of the system available online as a demonstration.

In 2003, CrunchBox technology was incorporated into the Guardian network security appliance developed by ShopIP in collaboration with Genesi and Diginexus. The Guardian's interface design and border-level protection were based on the CrunchBox, while additional security-scanning and intrusion-detection technology was supplied by the project's other partners. The system was presented at the Infosecurity 2003 conference in New York. Despite an endorsement from Wozniak and publicity from media profiles, the CrunchBox did not achieve widespread commercial success.

In 2007, Draper was named chief technology officer of En2go, a software company that developed media delivery tools. The company had previously been named Medusa Style Corp. It is unclear when Draper's involvement ceased; however, filings with the U.S. Securities and Exchange Commission document the resignations of several of its officers, including Wozniak, during the summer of 2009. En2Go never achieved commercial success.

=== Allegations of sexually inappropriate behavior ===
In 2017, organizers of at least four hacking and security-related conferences, including DEF CON and Hackers on Planet Earth, said they had banned Draper from attending in the wake of allegations against him concerning unwanted sexual attention toward other attendees. The allegations were reported in two stories by BuzzFeed News.

Further allegations concerning Draper's behavior emerged in reporting by the cybersecurity newsletter The Parallax View. In the story, a hacker given the pseudonym Jay claimed that in 2000, Draper invited him to a room in a San Diego office building. The story also covers claims by University of Pennsylvania computer science professor Matt Blaze, who asserted in a series of social media posts that Draper subjected him to persistent unwanted attention in the 1970s, when Blaze was a teenager.

Additionally, journalist Phil Lapsley alleged that Draper agreed to an interview in exchange for a partially clothed piggyback ride. Lapsley compared the encounter to an account in Doug Carlston's 1985 book Software People: An Insider's Look at the Personal Computer Software Industry, in which Carlston recounted an unnamed journalist's description of participating in stretching exercises with Draper.

Before the allegations were first reported by BuzzFeed News, Draper said that he had been diagnosed with Asperger syndrome, which he said could have contributed to his behavior. In an interview with The Daily Dot, Draper denied any explicit sexual intent during these encounters and described them as invitations to participate in an "energy workout" involving applied kinesiology. The workouts were described as including massage of the arms and legs, as well as squats and pushups while carrying Draper's body weight. Asked about an allegation that he had experienced an erection during one of the exercises, Draper said that this was possible, while maintaining that he had not regarded the encounter as sexual.

== Autobiography ==
In 2018, Draper and C. Wilson Fraser published Beyond the Little Blue Box: The Biographical Adventures of John T. Draper, a biography and memoir about Draper's life and career, published by FriesenPress. The book recounts Draper's involvement in phone phreaking, his experiences in the early personal-computer industry, and his later work in technology, and includes a foreword by Steve Wozniak.

The book combines Draper's recollections with a narrative by Fraser, who had known Draper for more than two decades. Kirkus Reviews characterized the work as a "biography/memoir" and described it as a "singular and entertaining tech account", praising its candid portrayal of Draper's unconventional life and experiences.

== In popular culture ==
The actor Wayne Péré played Draper in some brief scenes for the 1999 made-for-TV film Pirates of Silicon Valley.

In Ernest Cline's 2011 novel Ready Player One, Draper and his Captain Crunch alias are incorporated into the hunt for the Jade Key. The protagonist interprets references to a "captain" and a whistle as allusions to Draper and the Cap'n Crunch whistle associated with phone phreaking.

Draper appears in the 2001 Channel 4 documentary The Secret History of Hacking, which explores the early history of phone phreaking and computer hacking. The documentary features interviews with Draper, Steve Wozniak, and Kevin Mitnick, who discuss their experiences with the technologies and hacker culture of the period.

Draper is also mentioned throughout the poem "Phreaking" by the poet Neil Hilborn in his collection Our Numbered Days.
