= Red box (phreaking) =

Device used in phone phreaking

A red box is a phreaking device that generates tones to simulate inserting coins in pay phones, thus fooling the Automated Coin Toll System (ACTS) into completing free calls. In the United States, a nickel is represented by one tone, a dime by two, and a quarter by a set of five. Any device capable of playing back recorded sounds can potentially be used as a red box. Commonly used devices include modified Radio Shack tone dialers, personal MP3 players, and audio-recording greeting cards.

== History ==
The term "red box" to refer to a phreaking box dates to 1973 or earlier. Red box use became more widespread in the 1990s following the publication in 2600 Magazine of instructions on how to make a red box by replacing a crystal oscillator in a tone dialer. Red boxes grew obsolete in the 2000s as phone systems in the US and other nations updated their signaling technology.

== Technical details ==
=== United States ===
The tones are made by playing back 1700 Hz and 2200 Hz tones together. One 66 ms tone represents a nickel. A set of two 66 ms tones separated by 66 ms intervals represent a dime, and a quarter is represented by a set of five 33 ms tones with 33 ms pauses. A single 650 ms tone represents a dollar, but this is rarely used.

USA Red Boxing Tone
The .25 USD tone sequence.

The system that handles these tones is called the Automated Coin Toll Service, or ACTS. However, since ACTS has been phased out of service in much of the United States, combined with the integration of acoustic filters into many payphone handsets, the practice of red boxing is rarely possible any longer.

=== Canada ===
Canada formerly used a US-style ACTS coin phone system with a tone pair which would beep once for a nickel, twice for a dime and five times on receiving a quarter. These phones did not accept $1 coins (or the later $2 coin) and disappeared with the roll-out of Nortel Millennium payphones in the 1990s. The Millennium sets do not use ACTS in-band signalling tones as all coin-handling is automated in the phone itself.

=== United Kingdom ===
In the UK, a 1000 Hz tone for 200 ms represents a 10p coin, and 1000 Hz for 350 ms represents a 50p coin. Prior to this system, the earliest UK pay-on-answer payphones used a resistance, inserted into the loop for one or several short periods followed by a short flash (complete disconnection), to signal units of money inserted. Phreaks simulated these signals by unscrewing the microphone cover of the handset and inserting into the microphone circuit a resistor in parallel with a press-to-open push-button, getting the timing correct was difficult and failure to do this would result in the relay set controlling the call at the exchange to release, dropping the call. This was hard to do inconspicuously in outdoor payphones, and was more common indoors (e.g., in student halls of residence). Manipulating a telephone in this way was illegal and carried the specific offence of "abstracting electricity" from the GPO (later the Post Office and later still BT.)
