= 2600 hertz =

Audible telecommunication signal for control of telephone networks

2600 hertz (2600 Hz) is a frequency in hertz (cycles per second) that was used in telecommunication signaling in mid-20th century long-distance telephone networks using carrier systems.

2600 Hz
A 2600 Hz tone

Tone signaling carrier systems operated in the standard telephony voice frequency range (300Hz to 3500Hz). They replaced direct current (D.C.) signaling on toll trunk lines because they could be used with any type of toll facility over any length of transmission line that was suitable for voice transmissions. This included transmission through line repeaters and other facilities that would distort, block, or otherwise prohibit D.C. loop-disconnect signaling, such as rotary dial pulses, and on-hook/off-hook signaling. Common frequencies for this purpose were 1600Hz, 2000Hz, 2400Hz, 2600Hz, and 3700Hz, the latter being just outside the voice range. These signaling systems were continuous tone methods, so that the idle condition of a trunk line could easily be detected by the presence of the appropriate signaling frequency, in contrast to conditions of a quiet line which could be due to pauses in speech, or arise from line faults. The tones were typically transmitted in the same physical and logical channel, which characterizes these systems as in-band signaling methods, which do not require additional bandwidth for control of the network and benefit from a single amplification facility for speech and signaling.

The most common single-frequency signaling (SF) system in use in the United States from the 1950s to the 1970s used the frequency pairing of 2600 with 2400 hertz, while in other countries, some systems combined 2600Hz with a variety of lower frequencies in a compelled mode. Lower frequencies, such as 1600Hz, were used by the 1940s in composite signaling systems, however, the higher signal energy in speech at 1600Hz presented technical problems in protection against false operation. The in-band signaling method was vulnerable to talk-off conditions when the voice of a telephone user accidentally or intentionally generates the same tone or sufficiently strong spectral content at the frequency of the signaling system, a condition also known as falsing. In this instant, the call would be disconnected prematurely, and the trunk placed in idle condition. The Bell System in the United States used special signal-to-guard arrangements in the signaling receiver to detect this condition by comparison with the energy in the frequency spectrum outside the signaling tone. The condition was also often mitigated by narrow-band notch filters during the seized line state.

The discovery of this phenomenon by technology-curious individuals in the 1960s, led to the abuse by phreaking, a subculture that exploited the technology to explore national and international telephone networks and place cost-free long-distance telephone calls.

Combating abuse, and improving communications, the telephone industry transitioned to out-of-band signaling systems, such as Signalling System 7 (SS7), by the 1980s. This separated the voice and signaling channels, making it impossible to generate control signals in the voice bearer channel. The development of the T-carrier system in the 1960s helped obsoleting single-frequency (SF) signaling. SF signaling was replaced by advanced methods of common channel signaling, a technology in development since the 1920s.

In the 1970s, multi-frequency signaling systems came into use for international direct distance dialing (IDDD) which used the frequency of 2600Hz in line signaling in two-frequency mode with 2400Hz, for line seizure during call setup, and for tear-down.

2600Hz signaling was a standard for many international signaling systems, such as the Regional System R1.

The prominent application of the 2600Hz frequency in telecommunications world-wide inspired the name of many hacker communities and publications, such as 2600: The Hacker Quarterly, and the late 20th-century counterculture 2600.

== See also ==
- Blue box
- Signaling System No. 5
