= Signaling System No. 6 =

Signaling System No. 6 (SS6) was introduced in the 1970s as an early common channel signalling method for telecommunication trunks between international switching centers (ISCs). It is specified in CCITT Recommendations Q.251-Q.300.

The predecessor protocol to SS6, SS5, was carried In-band and was increasingly being exploited by phreakers. SS6 was out of band which gave it some protection from these attacks.

Traffic switching in the ISCs was then typically handled by crossbar switches or electronically controlled cross-points such as reed relays. The transmission media were likely satellite links or long terrestrial submarine cable channels. In some cases these were advantaged or multiplied with time-assignment speech interpolation (TASI) or digital circuit multiplication equipment (DCME). These transmission methods were not suited to line or inter-register signalling. Taking the signalling function away from the traffic channel could cut costs, and would later lead to Common Channel Signalling. There would be no need for filtering signalling away from speech, and the duty cycle of the costly trunk for each revenue earning call would be better. Signalling time in call set up and clear down would be significantly shorter than with C4 and C5. With telephone signalling not transmitted over the line, the opportunities for fraud were reduced.

The CCITT 6 signalling channel was typically a 2.4 kbit/s data link. Technology at the time was an M1040 or M1020 analogue Four-wire circuit presented private circuit link. Modems were slowly beginning to exceed these data rates over 4w circuits; these data links had the advantage that there was no national tail from the ISC out to a normal end point in the country. It was often the National Section that detracted the most from the quality and reliability of such links.

The data circuit known with a DP designation, would have been terrestrial with no TASI or DCME, and the C6 signalling on the data link could perform for 48 or 96 traffic channels. It could function for up to 2,048 in the maximum. The question is whether two operators would have that many traffic channels between them, dependent on just one bearer for signalling and subject to occasional failure. It was of course practice to have standby route over a diverse path in case of outage on the original DP data circuit link.

Finally it was considered possible that a mesh of such data channels could be set up between major centres, leading to a system where the link between country A and country B could perform the signalling functions for links to country A from country D for example.

CCITT No 6 was a method developed & implemented by administrations in a limited number of countries for use in correspondent International Switching of analogue telephone calls. The next development was correspondent and non-correspondent switching of telephone calls by new operators in the countries where more sophisticated methods were required.
