= Push-button telephone =

Telephone which has buttons or keys for dialing

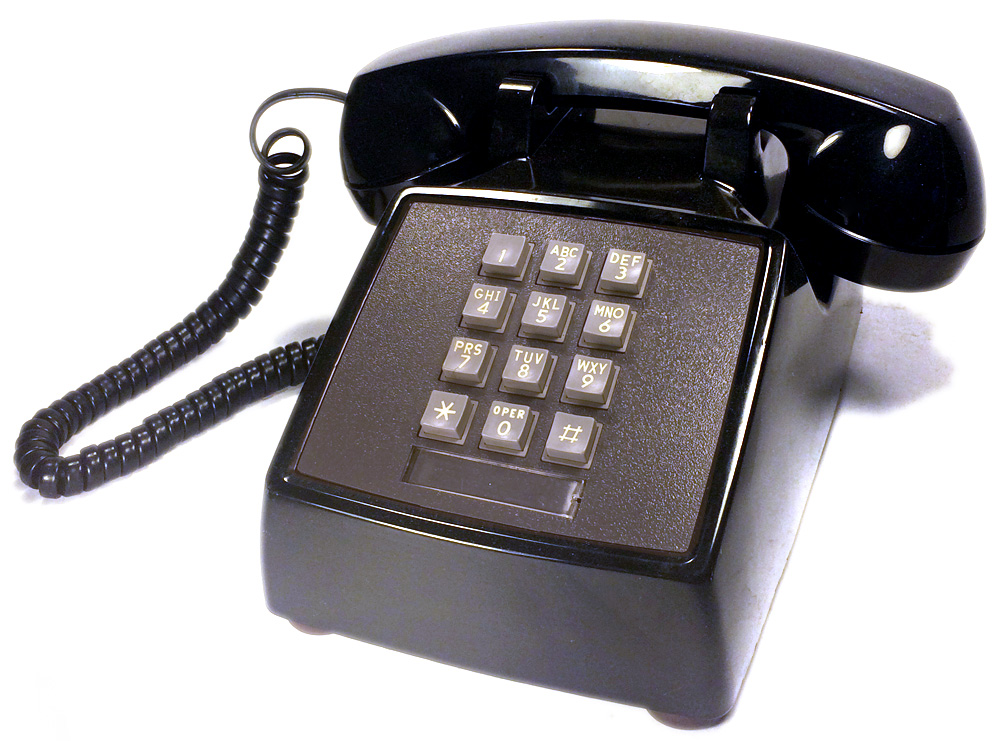
The Western Electric No. 2500, a typical American 12-button phone of the 1970s and early 80s

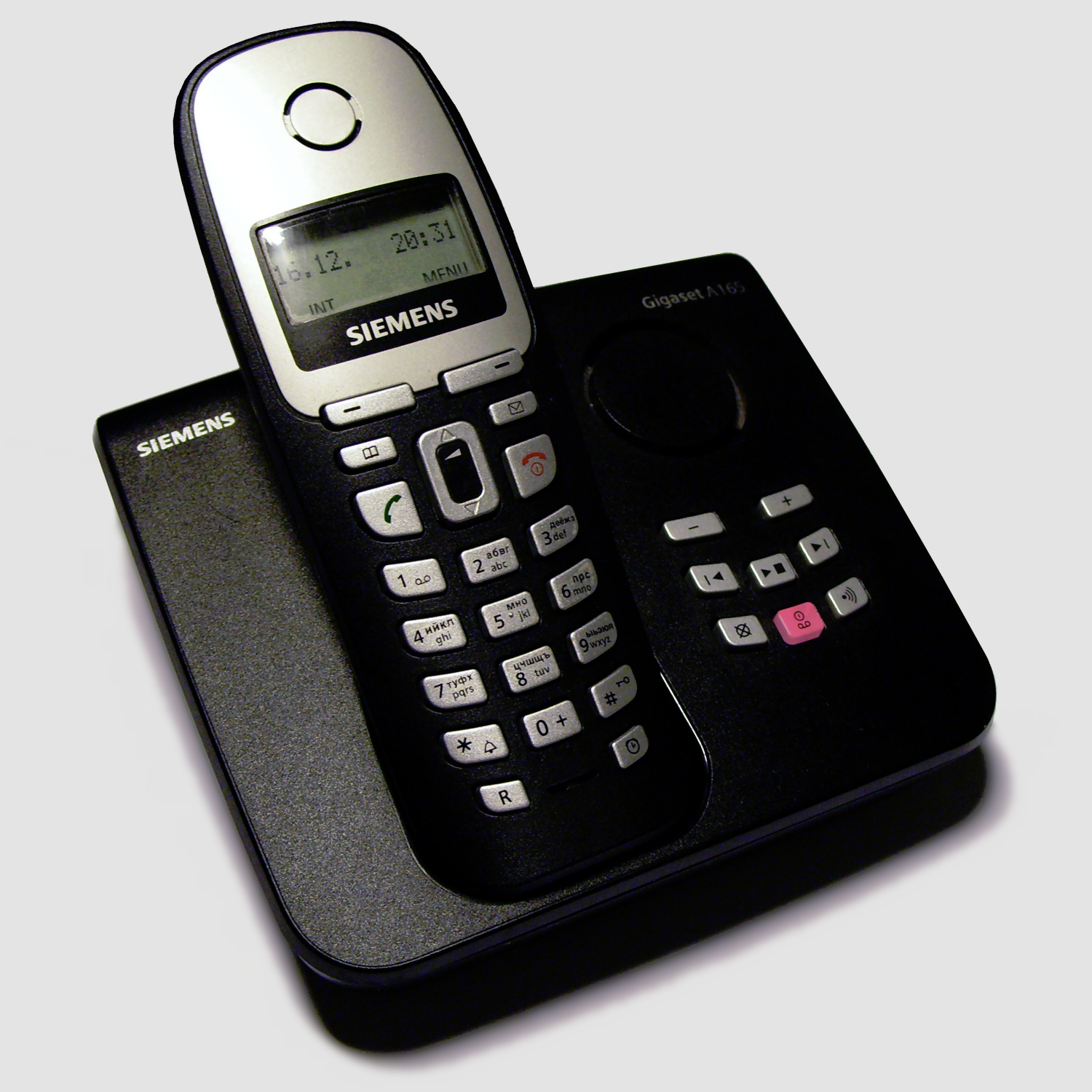
Gigaset A165 push-button cordless telephone using DECT with a base station

A push-button telephone is a telephone that has buttons or keys for dialing a telephone number, in contrast to a rotary dial used in earlier telephones.

Western Electric experimented as early as 1941 with methods of using mechanically activated reeds to produce two tones for each of the ten digits and by the late 1940s such technology was field-tested in a No. 5 Crossbar switching system in Pennsylvania. The technology at that time proved unreliable and it was not until after the invention of the transistor that push-button technology became practical.

The Bell System selected Findlay, Ohio as the first city in the U.S. for marketing tests of touch-tone service and Ohio Bell began installing push-button telephones in Findlay homes starting on 1 November 1960. The next market was in Greensburg, Pennsylvania, starting on 1 February 1961.

On 18 November 1963, after approximately three years of customer feedback, the Bell System officially introduced dual-tone multi-frequency (DTMF) technology in Carnegie, Pennsylvania and increased its use in Greensburg, under its registered trademark Touch-Tone. Over the next few decades touch-tone service replaced traditional pulse dialing technology and it eventually became a world-wide standard for telecommunication signaling.

Although DTMF signaling was the driving technology implemented in push-button telephones, some telephone manufacturers used push-button keypads to generate pulse dial signaling. Before the introduction of touch-tone telephone sets, the Bell System sometimes used the term push-button telephone to refer to key system telephones, which were rotary dial telephones that also had a set of push-buttons to select one of multiple telephone circuits, or to activate other features. Digital push-button telephones were introduced with the adoption of metal–oxide–semiconductor (MOS) integrated circuit (IC) technology in the early 1970s, with features such as the storage of phone numbers (like in a telephone directory) on MOS memory chips for speed dialing.

== History ==
The concept of push buttons in telephony originated around 1887 with a device called the micro-telephone push-button, but it was not an automatic dialing system as understood later. This use even predated the invention of the rotary dial by Almon Brown Strowger in 1891. The Bell System in the United States relied on manual switched service until 1919 when it reversed its decisions and embraced dialed automatic switching. The 1951 introduction of direct distance dialing required automatic transmission of dialed numbers between distant exchanges, leading to the use of inband multi-frequency signaling within the Long Lines network while individual local subscribers continued to dial using standard pulses.

As direct distance dialing expanded to a growing number of communities, local numbers (often four, five, or six digits) were extended to standardized seven-digit named exchanges. A toll call to another area code was eleven digits, including the leading 1. In the 1950s, AT&T conducted extensive studies of product engineering and efficiency and concluded that push-button dialing was preferable to rotary dialing.

Initial customer trials for the push-button telephone were conducted by the end of the 1950s in Hamdon, Connecticut, in a step-by-step switching system, and in Elgin, Illinois, in a No. 5 Crossbar central office. In 1960, approximately one fourth of the central office in Findlay, Ohio, was equipped with touch-tone digit registers for the first commercial deployment of push-button dialing, starting on 1 November 1960.

In 1962, Touch-Tone telephones, including other Bell innovations such as portable pagers, were on display for the public to try out at the Bell Systems pavilion at the Seattle World's Fair.

On 22 April 1963 President John F. Kennedy started the countdown for the opening of the 1964 World's Fair by keying "1964" on a touch-tone telephone in the Oval Office, starting "a contraption which will count off the seconds until the opening". On November 18, 1963, the first electronic push-button system with touch-tone dialing was commercially offered by Bell Telephone to customers in the Pittsburgh area towns of Carnegie and Greensburg, Pennsylvania, after the DTMF system had been tested for several years in multiple locations, including Greensburg. This phone, the Western Electric 1500, had only ten buttons. In 1968 it was replaced by the twelve-button model 2500, adding the asterisk or star (*) and the octothorpe or pound or hash (#) keys. The use of tones instead of dial pulses relied heavily on technology already developed for the long line network, although the 1963 touch-tone deployment adopted a different frequency set for its dual-tone multi-frequency signaling.

Although push-button touch-tone telephones made their debut to the general public in 1963, the rotary dial telephone still was common for many years. Sales of touch-tone telephones picked up speed during the 1970s, though the majority of telephone subscribers still had rotary phones, which in the Bell System of that era were leased from telephone companies instead of being owned outright. Adoption of the push-button phone was steady, but it took a long time for them to appear in some areas. At first it was primarily businesses that adopted push-button phones.

The touch-tone system required additional equipment at the telephone exchange to decode the tones. However, most telephone exchanges in the early 1970s only supported pulse dialling based on the Strowger switch system, restricting touch-tone telephones to some private branch exchanges (PBX). Tone to pulse converters were later added to linefinder groups in Step by Step offices to allow some subscribers to use DTMF sets.

British companies Pye TMC, Marconi-Elliott and GEC developed a new digital push-button telephone technology, based on metal–oxide–semiconductor (MOS) integrated circuit (IC) chip technology. It was variously called the "MOS telephone", the "push-button telephone chip", and the "telephone on a chip". It used MOS integrated circuit (MOS IC) logic, with thousands of MOS transistors on a chip, to convert the keypad input into a pulse signal. This made it possible for push-button telephones to be used with pulse dialling at most telephone exchanges.

MOS telephone technology introduced a new feature to push-button telephones: the use of MOS memory chips to store phone numbers, which could then be used for speed dialing at the push of a button. This was demonstrated in the United Kingdom by Pye TMC, Marconi-Elliot and GEC in 1970. Between 1971 and 1973, Bell Laboratories in the United States combined MOS technology with touch-tone technology to develop a push-button MOS touch-tone phone called the "Touch-O-Matic" telephone, which could store up to 32 phone numbers in an electronic telephone directory stored on memory chips. This was made possible by the low cost, low power requirements, small size and high reliability of MOS transistors, over 15,000 of which were contained on ten IC chips, including one chip for logic functions (such as shift registers and counters), one for the keypad dial interface, and eight for memory storage. By 1979, touch-tone phones were gaining popularity, but it was not until the 1980s that the majority of customers owned push-button telephones in their homes; by the 1990s, it was the overwhelming majority.

Some exchanges no longer support pulse-dialing or charge their few remaining pulse-dial users the higher tone-dial monthly rate as rotary telephones become increasingly rare. Dial telephones are not compatible with some modern telephone features, including interactive voice response systems, though enthusiasts may adapt pulse-dialing telephones using a pulse-to-tone converter. Most, but not all VoIP analogue Telephone Adapters (ATA) will only support DTMF dialling.

== Touch-tone ==
The international standard for digit signaling by telephones specifies dual-tone multi-frequency (DTMF) signaling, more commonly known as touch-tone dialing. It replaced older and slower pulse dial systems. The push-button format is also used for all cell phones, but with out-of-band signaling of the dialed number.

The touch-tone system uses audible dual tones for each of the digits. Later this was expanded by two keys labeled with a star (*) and a symbol called the square, similar to the pound or hash sign (#), to represent the 11th and 12th DTMF signals. These signals accommodate various additional services and customer-controlled calling features.

The DTMF standard assigns specific frequencies to each column and row of push-buttons of the telephone keypad; the columns in the push-button pad use a set of higher-frequency tones than the rows, both in the audible range. When a button is pressed, the dial generates a combination signal of the two frequencies from the high and low groups, respectively, producing a dual-tone signal, which is transmitted over the telephone line to the central office.

When introduced, the DTMF technology was not immediately available on all switching systems. The circuits of subscribers requesting the feature often had to be moved from older switches that supported only pulse dialing to a newer crossbar, or later an electronic switching system, requiring the assignment of a new telephone number which was billed at a higher monthly rate. Community dial office subscribers would often find the service initially unavailable as these villages were served by a single unattended exchange, often step by step, with service from a foreign exchange impractically expensive. Rural party line service was typically based on mechanical switching equipment which could not be upgraded.

While a tone-to-pulse converter could be deployed to any existing mechanical office line using 1970s technology, its speed would be limited to pulse dialing rates. The new central office switches were backward-compatible with rotary dialing.

=== DTMF keypad layout ===
DTMF keypad layout

DTMF dialing
How DTMF dialing sounds

The standard layout of the keys on the touch-tone telephone was the result of research of the human-engineering department at Bell Laboratories in the 1950s under the leadership of South African-born psychologist John Elias Karlin (1918–2013), who was previously a leading proponent in the introduction of all-number-dialing in the Bell System. This research resulted in the design of the DTMF keypad that arranged the push-buttons into 12 positions in a 3-by-4 position rectangular array, and placed the 1, 2, and 3 keys in the top row for most accurate dialing. The remaining digits occupied the lower rows in sequence from left to right; the 0, however, was placed into the center of the fourth row, while omitting the lower left and lower right positions.

The DTMF keyboard layout broke with the tradition established in cash registers (and later adopted in calculators and computers) of having the lower numbers at the bottom. This was due to research conducted by Bell Labs using test subjects unfamiliar with keypads. Comparing various layouts including two-row, two-column, and circular configurations, the study concluded that while there was little difference in speed or accuracy between any of the layouts, the now familiar arrangement with 1 at the top was the most favourably rated.

The engineers had envisioned telephones being used to access computers, and surveyed business customers for possible uses. This led to the addition of the number sign (#, pound or diamond in this context, hash, square or gate in the UK, and octothorpe by the original engineers) and asterisk or star (*) keys in 1969. Later, the hash and asterisk keys were used in vertical service codes, such as *67 to suppress caller ID in the Bell System.

In military telephone systems four additional signals (A, B, C, D) were defined for signaling call priority.

== Pulse dialing ==
Iskra ETA85 pushbutton telephone with pulse-dialing keypad (Yugoslavia, 1988).

Historically, not all push-button telephones used DTMF dialing technology. Some manufacturers implemented pulse dialing with push-button keypads and even Western Electric produced several telephone models with a push-button keypad that could also emit traditional dial pulses. Sometimes the mode was user-selectable with a switch on the telephone. Pulse-mode push-button keypads typically stored the dialed number sequence in a digit collector register to permit rapid dialing for the user. Some push button pulse dial phones allow for double-speed pulse dialing. These allow even faster pulse dialing in exchanges that recognize double-speed pulse dialing.

As telephone companies continued to levy surcharges for touch-tone service long after any technical justification ceased to exist, a push-button telephone with pulse dialing capability represented a means for a user to obtain the convenience of push-button dialing without incurring the touch-tone surcharge.

== DC signaling ==
Heemaf 1955 type wall telephone by Philips with DC signaling pushbutton dial (Netherlands, Dec.1962).

In the 1950s, the Dutch electronics concern Philips developed a direct current (DC) signaling method for dialing telephone numbers, for use in the UB-49 private branch exchange (PBX) system. The push-button dial pad used an arrangement of semiconductor diodes to produce a distinct sequence of polarity states for each dialed digit between the two line conductors and ground return, which were analyzed in the exchange by relay logic.

In 1968, the system was used in the UK, in a brief excursion from standards, when the General Post Office (GPO) introduced the first UK-made push-button telephone, the GPO 726 (Ericsson N2000 series).

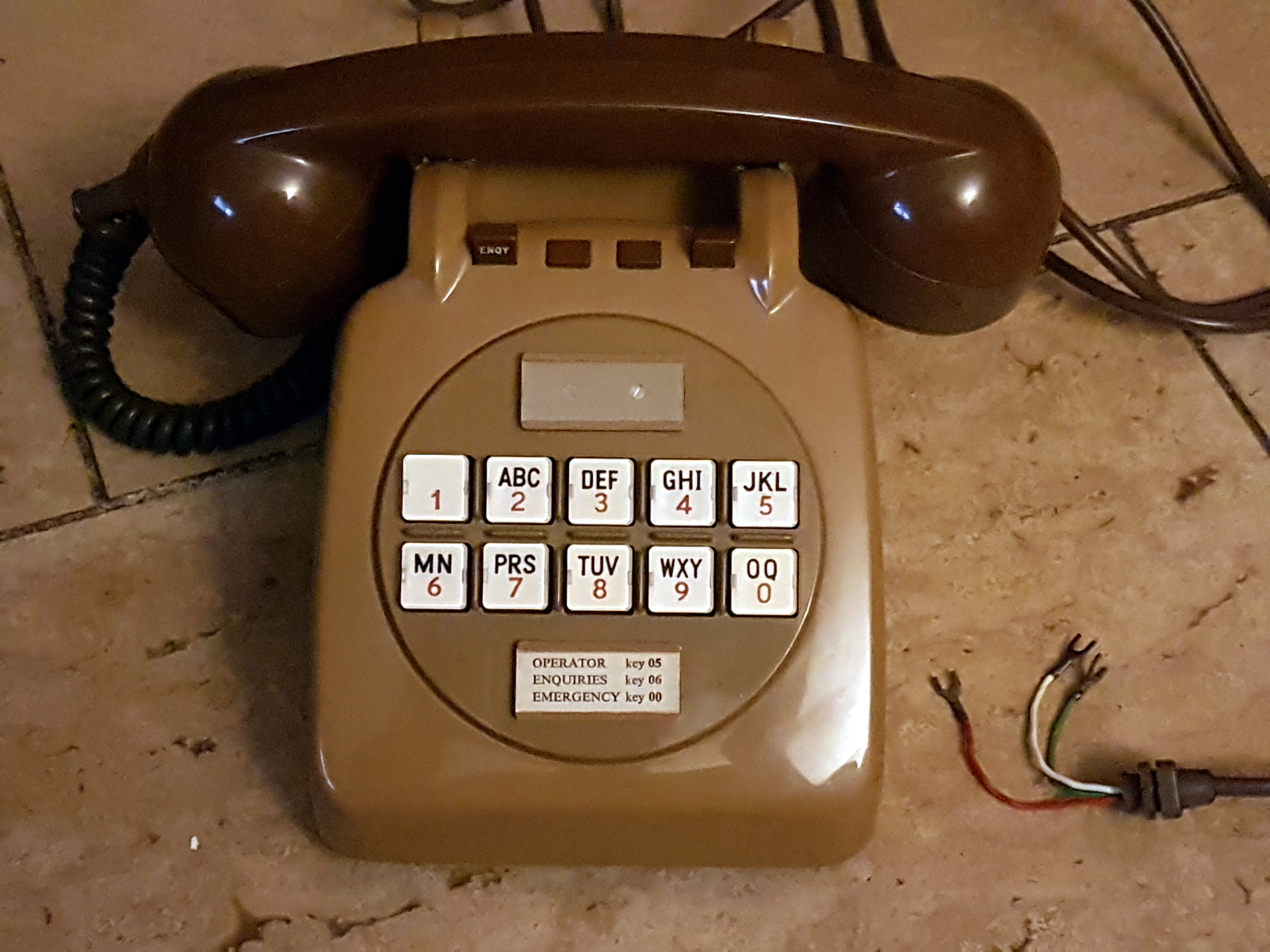
British GPO 726 telephone with DC signaling dial pad (1968).

== Features ==
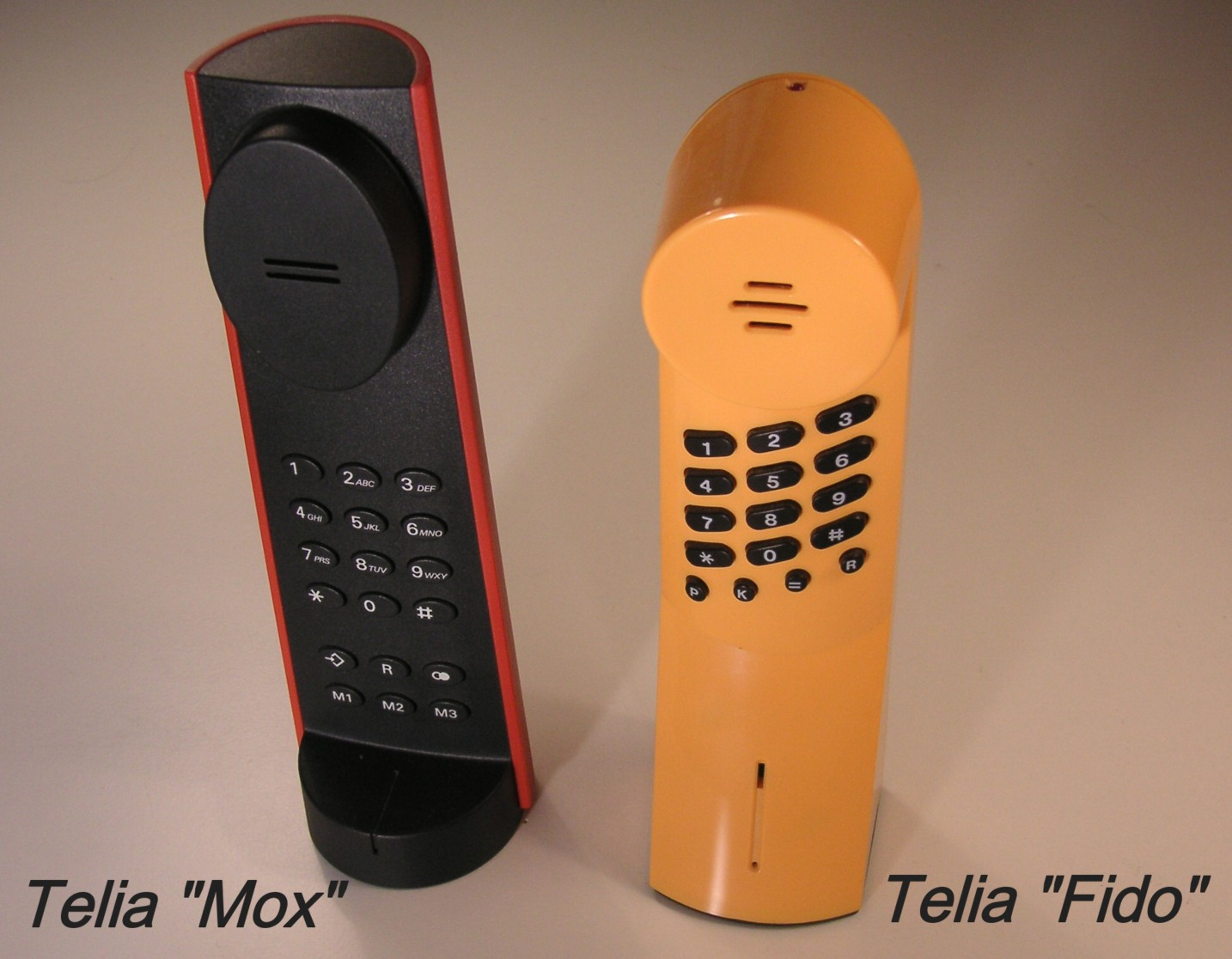
Telia Mox and Fido

Electronics within push-button telephones may provide several usability features, such as last number redial and storage of commonly called numbers. Some telephone models support additional features, such as retrieval of information and data or code and PIN entry.

Most analog telephone adapters for Internet-based telecommunications (VoIP) recognize and translate DTMF tones but ignore dial pulses, an issue which also exists for some PBX systems. Like cellular handsets, telephones designed for voice-over-IP use out-of-band signaling to send the dialed number.

== See also ==
- History of the telephone
- Mobile phone
- Timeline of the telephone
