= Signaling System No. 5 =

1970s telephone signaling system

The Signaling System No. 5 (SS5) is a multi-frequency (MF) telephone signaling system that was in use from the 1970s for International Direct Distance Dialing (IDDD). Internationally it became known as CCITT5 or CC5. It was also nicknamed Atlantic Code because it was used for the first IDDD connections between Europe and North America.

Signaling systems in use at the time were designed for in-band signaling, meaning they used the same channel as the media that they controlled. SS5 was designed for inter-continental traffic for which many transmission paths were long terrestrial, often submarine cable, and geostationary satellite links. Trunks using satellite links also had echo suppressors connected at their end points. SS5 was specifically designed to work within those links.

Based on the Bell System multi-frequency (MF) signaling system known by CCITT as Regional System R1, it used six signaling frequencies: 700 Hz (A), 900 Hz (B), 1100 Hz (C), 1300 Hz (D), 1500 Hz (E) and 1700 Hz (F). The first five frequencies were used in a two-out-of-five code to represent decimal numbers (telephone numbers), and the last frequency in combination with one of the others represented the beginning or end of a sequence of digits. These frequencies were combined to encode the following signals:

Frequency pair						Code	Signal
A	B	C	D	E	F	Code	Signal
X	X					1	digit 1
X		X				2	digit 2
	X	X				3	digit 3
X			X			4	digit 4
	X		X			5	digit 5
		X	X			6	digit 6
X				X		7	digit 7
	X			X		8	digit 8
		X		X		9	digit 9
			X	X		0	digit 0
X					X	11	code 11, or a prefix to reach any international operator in the country
	X				X	12	code 12, or a prefix to reach an individual international operator in the country
		X			X	13	code 13, the keying prefix (KP1) where the following digits do not contain a country code (Terminal working)
			X		X	14	code 14, the keying prefix (KP2) where the following digits do contain a country code (Transit working)
				X	X	15	code 15, the keying finish (KF or End-of-keying) code instructing the register not to wait for any more digits

The 2 out of 6 frequency code was used to pass digits forward between Registers in traditional International Switching Centres. Each digit took 55 ms with a 55 ms Inter-digital pause (IDP) and the sequence was sent 'en-bloc' to ensure that Echo Suppressors would not switch out the forward path as the links tended often to be satellite channels. The first digit was a keying Prefix (a KP) to indicate Terminal or Transit working and the last digit was the digit 15 or Keying Finish (KF).

In addition, for line signaling a 2 frequency (2VF) code using compelled sequences of 2400 Hz and 2600 Hz rather than continuous SF tone was used to seize the line at the beginning of a call over that trunk and clear it at the end of the call - long after the valuable register had sent 15 or KF and dissociated from the call. This Line signalling element was 2VF to introduce the possibility of more meanings and tone-off idle in order that hundreds of channels in transmission media would not be transmitting standing tones simultaneously.

== Abuse and fraud ==
The deficiencies of SS5 are widely known as the root cause for "Blue box fraud" that enabled phone phreaks, such as Captain Crunch (John Draper), to abuse the telephone system and place telephone calls for free, among exploiting other capabilities. SS5 was abused by sending a "seize" signal to simulate and pose as a telephone switching system from a subscriber telephone line. This enabled the perpetrator to control the remote switch that had no means for distinguishing the signaling from that of another legitimate switch.

This fraud was a factor in the widespread adoption of Signalling System No. 7 (SS7) in replacement of SS5.

== See also ==
- Signaling System No. 6
