= Out-of-band =

In telecommunications, out-of-band activity is activity outside a defined frequency band, or, metaphorically, outside of any primary communication channel. Protection from falsing is among its purposes.

== Examples ==
=== General usage ===
- Out-of-band agreement, an agreement or understanding between the communicating parties that is not included in any message sent over the channel but which is relevant for the interpretation of such messages
- More broadly, communication by any channel other than the primary channel can be considered "out-of-band". For example, given a website's primary communication method is the internet, out-of-band communication may be an SMS message or even beeps produced by a speaker on the server itself.

=== Telecommunications ===
- Out-of-band signaling, the exchange of call control information in a separate band from the data or voice stream, or on an entirely separate, dedicated channel

=== Computing ===
- Out-of-band data, in computer networking, a separate stream of data from the main data stream
- Out-of-band management, in computer administration, system console access, even in the event of primary network subsystem failure
- Out-of-band authentication, user authentication over a network or channel separate from the primary network or channel; used in multi-factor authentication
- Out-of-band software documentation, documentation that is not provided together with the software it documents. This contrasts with Unix and Unix-like systems, for example, where software is documented through the means of on-line (meaning 'on a main computer', not 'over the internet') man pages provided as a component of the operating system. Out-of-band documentation, whether on web pages or in printed form, can suffer from a mismatch regarding the version and the exact set of features that are being documented.

== See also ==
- In-band signaling
- Ident protocol
