= Signal =

Varying physical quantity that conveys information

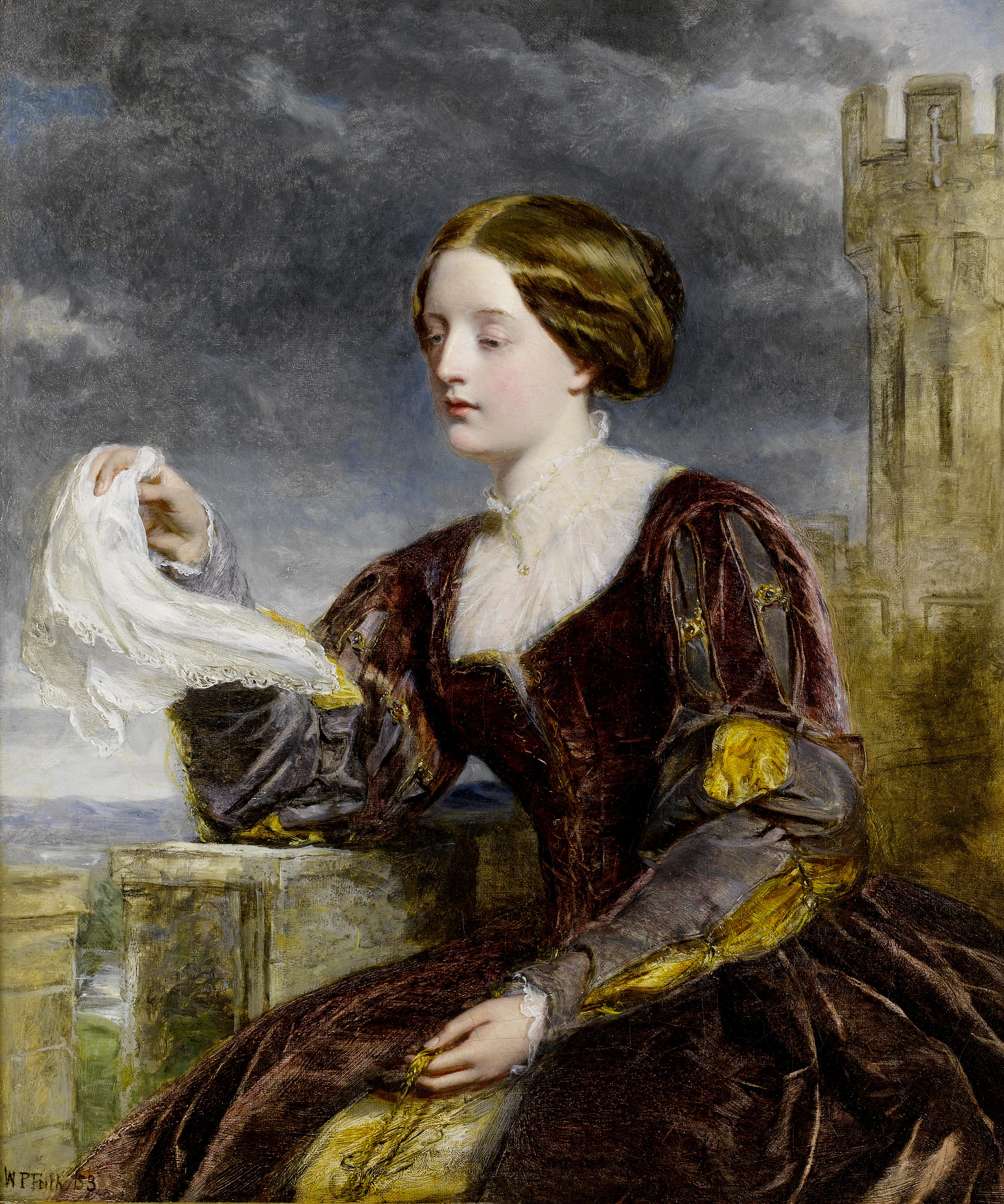
In The Signal by William Powell Frith, a woman sends a signal by waving a white handkerchief.

A signal is both the process and the result of transmission of data over some media accomplished by embedding some variation. Signals are important in multiple subject fields, including signal processing, information theory and biology.

In signal processing, a signal is a function that conveys information about a phenomenon. Any quantity that can vary over space or time can be used as a signal to share messages between observers. The IEEE Transactions on Signal Processing includes audio, video, speech, image, sonar, and radar as examples of signals. A signal may also be defined as any observable change in a quantity over space or time (a time series), even if it does not carry information. (Note: Some authors do not emphasize the role of information in the definition of a signal.)

In nature, signals can be actions done by an organism to alert other organisms, ranging from the release of plant chemicals to warn nearby plants of a predator, to sounds or motions made by animals to alert other animals of food. Signaling occurs in all organisms, even at cellular levels, with cell signaling. Signaling theory, in evolutionary biology, proposes that a substantial driver for evolution is the ability of animals to communicate with each other by developing ways of signaling. In human engineering, signals are typically provided by a sensor, and often the original form of a signal is converted to another form of energy using a transducer. For example, a microphone converts an acoustic signal to a voltage waveform, and a speaker does the reverse.

Another important property of a signal is its entropy or information content. Information theory serves as the formal study of signals and their content. The information of a signal is often accompanied by noise, which primarily refers to unwanted modifications of signals, but is often extended to include unwanted signals conflicting with desired signals (crosstalk). The reduction of noise is covered in part under the heading of signal integrity. The separation of desired signals from background noise is the field of signal recovery, one branch of which is estimation theory, a probabilistic approach to suppressing random disturbances.

Engineering disciplines such as electrical engineering have advanced the design, study, and implementation of systems involving transmission, storage, and manipulation of information. In the latter half of the 20th century, electrical engineering itself separated into several disciplines: electronic engineering and computer engineering developed to specialize in the design and analysis of systems that manipulate physical signals, while design engineering developed to address the functional design of signals in user–machine interfaces.

== Definitions ==
Definitions specific to sub-fields are common:

- In electronics and telecommunications, signal refers to any time-varying voltage, current, or electromagnetic wave that carries information.
- In signal processing, signals are analog and digital representations of analog physical quantities.
- In information theory, a signal is a codified message, that is, the sequence of states in a communication channel that encodes a message.
- In a communication system, a transmitter encodes a message to create a signal, which is carried to a receiver by the communication channel. For example, the words "Mary had a little lamb" might be the message spoken into a telephone. The telephone transmitter converts the sounds into an electrical signal. The signal is transmitted to the receiving telephone by wires; at the receiver, it is reconverted into sounds.
- In telephone networks, signaling, for example common-channel signaling, refers to phone number and other digital control information rather than the actual voice signal.

== Classification ==
Signals can be categorized in various ways. The most common distinction is between discrete and continuous spaces that the functions are defined over, for example, discrete and continuous-time domains. Discrete-time signals are often referred to as time series in other fields. Continuous-time signals are often referred to as continuous signals.

A second important distinction is between discrete-valued and continuous-valued. Particularly in digital signal processing, a digital signal may be defined as a sequence of discrete values, typically associated with an underlying continuous-valued physical process. In digital electronics, digital signals are the continuous-time waveform signals in a digital system, representing a bit-stream.

Signals may also be categorized by their spatial distributions as either point source signals (PSSs) or distributed source signals (DSSs).

In Signals and Systems, signals can be classified according to many criteria, mainly: according to the different feature of values, classified into analog signals and digital signals; according to the determinacy of signals, classified into deterministic signals and random signals; according to the strength of signals, classified into energy signals and power signals.

=== Analog and digital signals ===
A digital signal has two or more distinguishable waveforms, in this example, high voltage and low voltages, each of which can be mapped onto a digit. Characteristically, noise can be removed from digital signals provided it is not too extreme.

Two main types of signals encountered in practice are analog and digital. The figure shows a digital signal that results from approximating an analog signal by its values at particular time instants. Digital signals are quantized, while analog signals are continuous.

==== Analog signal ====
An analog signal is any continuous signal for which the time-varying feature of the signal is a representation of some other time-varying quantity, i.e., analogous to another time-varying signal. For example, in an analog audio signal, the instantaneous voltage of the signal varies continuously with the sound pressure. It differs from a digital signal, in which the continuous quantity is a representation of a sequence of discrete values which can only take on one of a finite number of values.

The term analog signal usually refers to electrical signals; however, analog signals may use other mediums such as mechanical, pneumatic or hydraulic. An analog signal uses some property of the medium to convey the signal's information. For example, an aneroid barometer uses rotary position as the signal to convey pressure information. In an electrical signal, the voltage, current, or frequency of the signal may be varied to represent the information.

Any information may be conveyed by an analog signal; often, such a signal is a measured response to changes in physical phenomena, such as sound, light, temperature, position, or pressure. The physical variable is converted to an analog signal by a transducer. For example, in sound recording, fluctuations in air pressure (that is to say, sound) strike the diaphragm of a microphone, which induces corresponding electrical fluctuations. The voltage or the current is said to be an analog of the sound.

==== Digital signal ====
A binary signal, also known as a logic signal, is a digital signal with two distinguishable levels.

A digital signal is a signal that is constructed from a discrete set of waveforms of a physical quantity so as to represent a sequence of discrete values. A logic signal is a digital signal with only two possible values, and describes an arbitrary bit stream. Other types of digital signals can represent three-valued logic or higher-valued logics.

Alternatively, a digital signal may be considered to be the sequence of codes represented by such a physical quantity. The physical quantity may be a variable electric current or voltage, the intensity, phase or polarization of an optical or other electromagnetic field, acoustic pressure, the magnetization of a magnetic storage media, etc. Digital signals are present in all digital electronics, notably computing equipment and data transmission.

With digital signals, system noise, provided it is not too great, will not affect system operation, whereas noise always degrades the operation of analog signals to some degree.

Digital signals often arise via sampling of analog signals, for example, a continually fluctuating voltage on a line that can be digitized by an analog-to-digital converter circuit, wherein the circuit will read the voltage level on the line, say, every 50 microseconds and represent each reading with a fixed number of bits. The resulting stream of numbers is stored as digital data on a discrete-time and quantized-amplitude signal. Computers and other digital devices are restricted to discrete time.

=== Energy and power ===
According to the strengths of signals, practical signals can be classified into two categories: energy signals and power signals.

Energy signals: Those signals' energy are equal to a finite positive value, but their average powers are 0;

$0 < E = \int_{-\infty }^{\infty } s^2(t)dt < \infty$

Power signals: Those signals' average power are equal to a finite positive value, but their energy are infinite.

$P = \lim_{T\rightarrow \infty} \frac{1}{T} \int_{-T/2 }^{T/2} s^2(t)dt$

=== Deterministic and random ===
Deterministic signals are those whose values at any time are predictable and can be calculated by a mathematical equation.

Random signals are signals that take on random values at any given time instant and must be modeled stochastically.

=== Even and odd ===
Even and odd signals

$f(x)=x^2$ is an example of an even signal.

$f(x)=x^3$ is an example of an odd signal.

An even signal satisfies the condition $x(t) = x(-t)$

or equivalently if the following equation holds for all $t$ and $-t$ in the domain of $x$:

$$x(t) - x(-t) = 0.$$

An odd signal satisfies the condition $x(t) = - x(-t)$

or equivalently if the following equation holds for all $t$ and $-t$ in the domain of $x$:

$$x(t) + x(-t) = 0.$$

=== Periodic ===
A signal is said to be periodic if it satisfies the condition:

$x(t) = x(t + T)\quad \forall t \in [t_0 , t_{max}]$ or $x(n) = x(n + N)\quad \forall n \in [n_0 , n_{max}]$

Where:

$T$ = fundamental time period,

$1/T = f$= fundamental frequency.

The same can be applied to $N$. A periodic signal will repeat for every period.

==== Time discretization ====
Discrete-time signal created from a continuous signal by sampling

Signals can be classified as continuous or discrete time. In the mathematical abstraction, the domain of a continuous-time signal is the set of real numbers (or some interval thereof), whereas the domain of a discrete-time (DT) signal is the set of integers (or other subsets of real numbers). What these integers represent depends on the nature of the signal; most often, it is time.

A continuous-time signal is any function which is defined at every time t in an interval, most commonly an infinite interval. A simple source for a discrete-time signal is the sampling of a continuous signal, approximating the signal by a sequence of its values at particular time instants.

=== Amplitude quantization ===
If a signal is to be represented as a sequence of digital data, it is impossible to maintain exact precision – each number in the sequence must have a finite number of digits. As a result, the values of such a signal must be quantized into a finite set for practical representation. Quantization is the process of converting a continuous analog audio signal to a digital signal with discrete numerical values of integers.

== Examples ==
Naturally occurring signals can be converted to electronic signals by various sensors. Examples include:

- Motion. The motion of an object can be considered to be a signal and can be monitored by various sensors to provide electrical signals. For example, radar can provide an electromagnetic signal for following aircraft motion. A motion signal is one-dimensional (time), and the range is generally three-dimensional. Position is thus a 3-vector signal; the position and orientation of a rigid body is a 6-vector signal. Orientation signals can be generated using a gyroscope.
- Sound. Since a sound is a vibration of a medium (such as air), a sound signal associates a pressure value to every value of time and possibly three space coordinates indicating the direction of travel. A sound signal is converted to an electrical signal by a microphone, generating a voltage signal as an analog of the sound signal. Sound signals can be sampled at a discrete set of time points; for example, compact discs (CDs) contain discrete signals representing sound, recorded at 44,100 Hz; since CDs are recorded in stereo, each sample contains data for a left and right channel, which may be considered to be a 2-vector signal. The CD encoding is converted to an electrical signal by reading the information with a laser, converting the sound signal to an optical signal.
- Images. A picture or image consists of a brightness or color signal, a function of a two-dimensional location. The object's appearance is presented as emitted or reflected light, an electromagnetic signal. It can be converted to voltage or current waveforms using devices such as the charge-coupled device. A 2D image can have a continuous spatial domain, as in a traditional photograph or painting; or the image can be discretized in space, as in a digital image. Color images are typically represented as a combination of monochrome images in three primary colors.
- Videos. A video signal is a sequence of images. A point in a video is identified by its two-dimensional position in the image and by the time at which it occurs, so a video signal has a three-dimensional domain. Analog video has one continuous domain dimension (across a scan line) and two discrete dimensions (frame and line).
- Temperature, conveyed for example by a thermocouple output.
- pH or acidity, provided by a pH meter.
- Biosignals. A biosignal is any signal in a living organism that can be continually measured. The term biosignal is often used to refer to bioelectrical signals, but it may refer to both electrical and non-electrical signals. The usual understanding is to refer only to time-varying signals, although spatial parameter variations (e.g., the nucleotide sequence determining the genetic code) are sometimes subsumed as well.
  - Membrane potential. This biosignal is the voltage across a biological membrane. The domain is more difficult to establish. Some cells or organelles have the same membrane potential throughout; neurons generally have different potentials at different points. These signals have very low energies, but are enough to make nervous systems work; they can be measured in aggregate by electrophysiology techniques.

== Signal processing ==
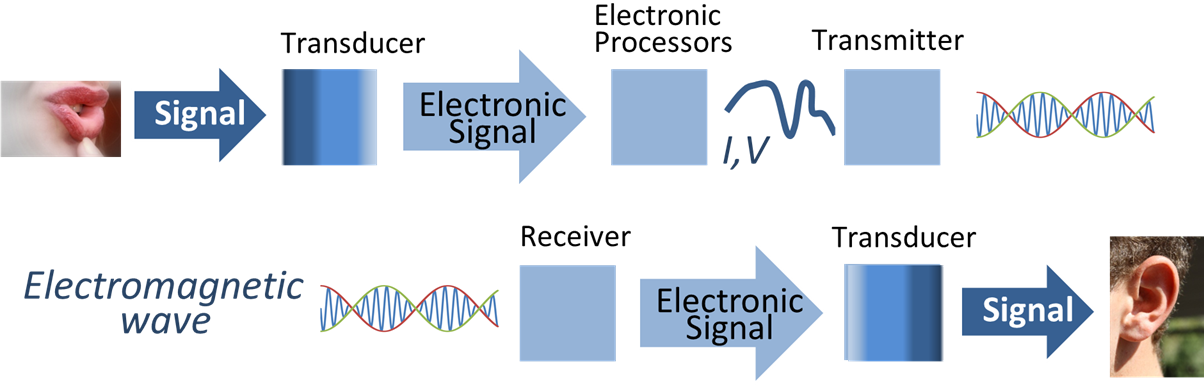
Signal transmission using electronic signals

Signal processing is the analysis and manipulation of signals. A common example is signal transmission between different locations. The embodiment of a signal in electrical form is made by a transducer that converts the signal from its original form to a waveform expressed as a current or a voltage, or electromagnetic radiation, for example, an optical signal or radio transmission. Once expressed as an electronic signal, the signal is available for further processing by electrical devices such as electronic amplifiers and filters, and can be transmitted to a remote location by a transmitter and received using radio receivers.

== Signals and systems ==
In electrical engineering (EE) programs, signals are covered in a class and field of study known as signals and systems. Depending on the school, undergraduate EE students generally take the class as juniors or seniors, normally depending on the number and level of previous linear algebra and differential equation classes they have taken.

The field studies input and output signals, and the mathematical representations between them known as systems, in four domains: time, frequency, s and z. Since signals and systems are both studied in these four domains, there are 8 major divisions of study. As an example, when working with continuous-time signals (t), one might transform from the time domain to a frequency or s domain; or from discrete time (n) to frequency or z domains. Systems can also be transformed between these domains, like signals, with continuous to s and discrete to z.

Signals and systems is a subset of the field of mathematical modeling. It involves circuit analysis and design via mathematical modeling and some numerical methods, and was updated several decades ago with dynamical systems tools, including differential equations, and recently, Lagrangians. Students are expected to understand the modeling tools as well as the mathematics, physics, circuit analysis, and transformations between the 8 domains.

Because mechanical engineering (ME) topics like friction, dampening etc. have very close analogies in signal science (inductance, resistance, voltage, etc.), many of the tools originally used in ME transformations (Laplace and Fourier transforms, Lagrangians, sampling theory, probability, difference equations, etc.) have now been applied to signals, circuits, systems and their components, analysis and design in EE. Dynamical systems that involve noise, filtering and other random or chaotic attractors and repellers have now placed stochastic sciences and statistics between the more deterministic discrete and continuous functions in the field. (Deterministic, as used here, means signals that are completely determined as functions of time).

EE taxonomists are still not decided where signals and systems falls within the whole field of signal processing vs. circuit analysis and mathematical modeling, but the common link of the topics that are covered in the course of study has brightened boundaries with dozens of books, journals, etc. called "Signals and Systems", and used as text and test prep for the EE, as well as, recently, computer engineering exams.

== Gallery ==
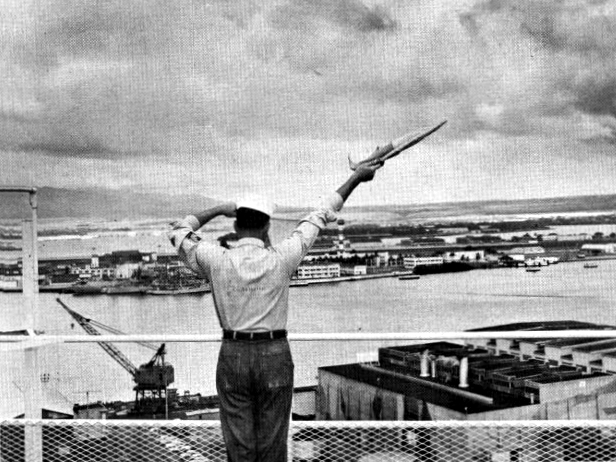
A signalman sends a semaphore message from a Pearl Harbor Control Tower, c. 1960.

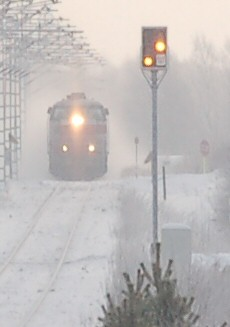
A Finnish distant signal at the western approach to Muhos station is displaying Expect Stop.

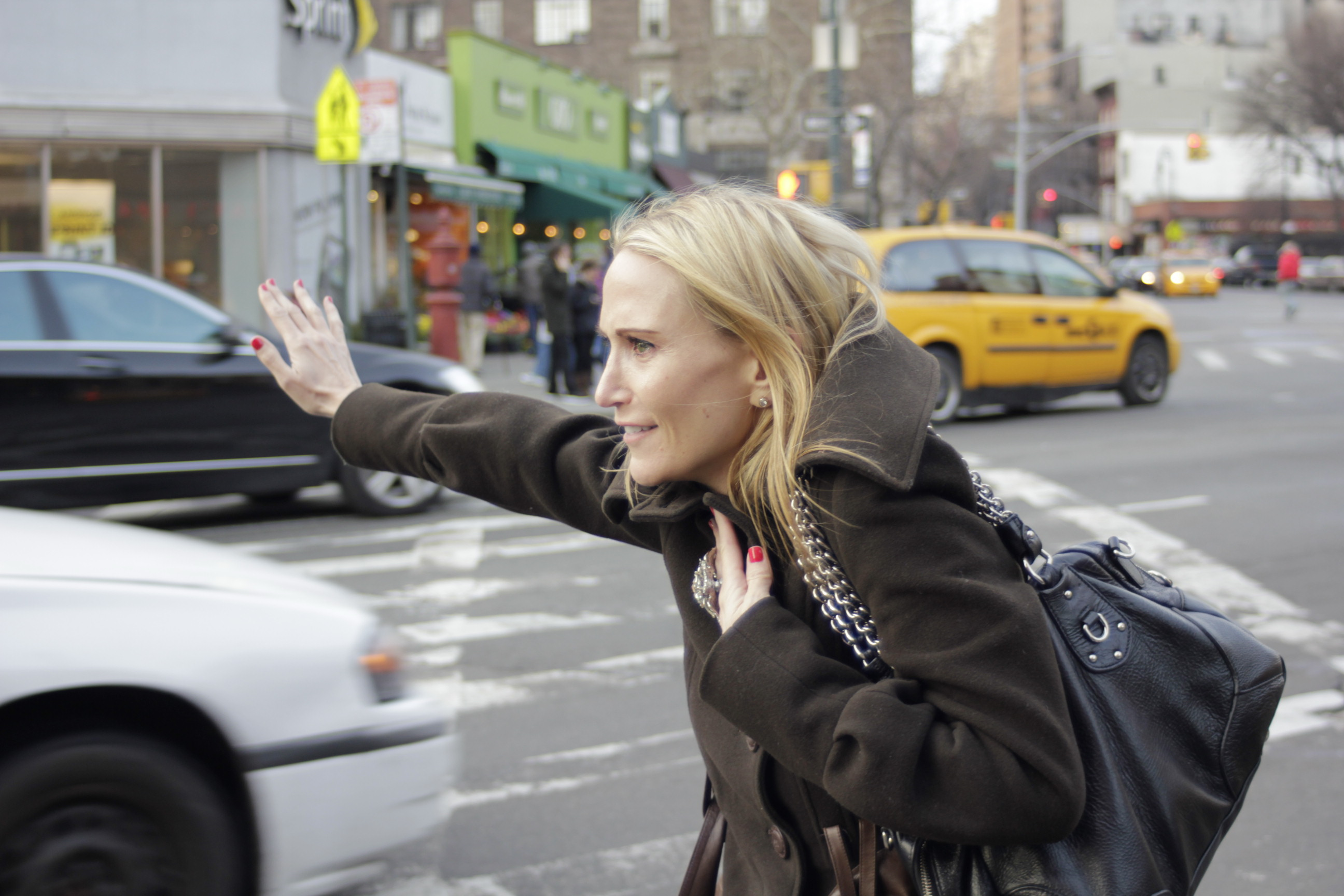
A woman hailing a cab is sending a signal of availability to be picked up.

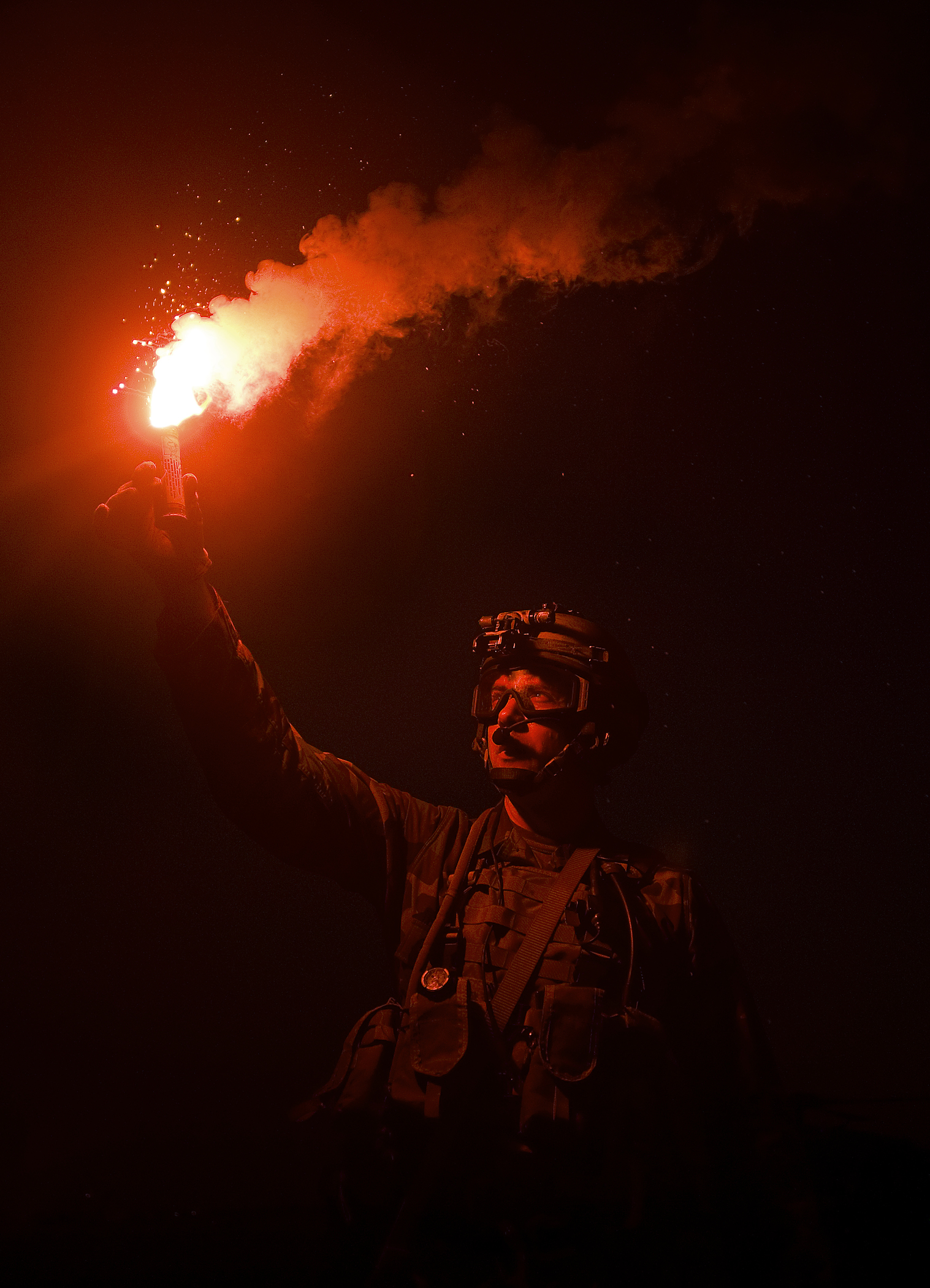
A flare is a common means to signal during dark or smoke-filled conditions.

== See also ==
- A Mathematical Theory of Communication – 1948 scholarly article by Claude Shannon
- Beacon
- Current loop – a signaling system in widespread use for process control
- Signal-to-noise ratio
