= Out-of-band agreement =

In the exchange of information over a communication channel, an out-of-band agreement is an agreement or understanding between the communicating parties that is not included in any message sent over the channel but which is relevant for the interpretation of such messages.

By extension, in a client–server or provider-requester setting, an out-of-band agreement is an agreement or understanding that governs the semantics of the request/response interface but which is not part of the formal or contractual description of the interface specification itself.

== See also ==
- API
- Contract
- Out-of-band
- Off-balance-sheet
- Parol evidence rule
