= Falsing =

Telecommunication system error

In telecommunications, falsing is a signaling error condition when a signal decoder detects a valid input although the implied protocol function was not intended. This is also known as a false decode. Other forms are referred to as talk-off.

== Signal detection ==
Signal decoders used in communication systems, such as telephony and two-way radio systems, detect communication protocol states by recognizing a variety of electrical, optical, or acoustic conditions. Misinterpretation of those conditions leads to communication errors. Proper detection of signaling is a compromise between acceptable error rates and cost of implementation. The engineering problem is to produce the simplest circuit that works reliably. A decoder generally tries to filter audio input to strip off every audio component except a sought-after, specific tone. In part, a decoder is a narrow bandpass filter. A signal that gets through the narrow filter is rectified into a DC voltage which is used to switch something on or off.

Falsing sometimes occurs on a voice circuit when a human voice hits the exact pitch to which the tone decoder is tuned, a condition called talk-off.

For the tone decoder to work reliably, the audio input level must be in the linear range of audio stages, (undistorted). A 1,500 Hz tone fed into an amplifier that distorts the tone could produce a harmonic at 3,000 Hz, falsely triggering a decoder that is tuned to 3,000 Hz.

== Examples ==
Examples of decoder falsing include:

- a telephone answering machine detects dial pulses from a rotary dial as ringing voltage, with the result that the answering machine answers in response to dialing.
- a two-way radio with an enabled CTCSS decoder turns on the receive audio for one or two syllables of a signal with a close-in-tone-frequency (but wrong) CTCSS tone. The person listening to the radio occasionally hears nonsense partial words from the receiver's speaker: "et"... "up"...
- a ringy telephone circuit with SF single-frequency signaling and poor level discipline drops calls because it sees harmonic frequencies or the distorted waveform as a valid "circuit idle" or "on-hook" SF signal.
- power line transients cause a telemetry decoder to momentarily decode the power line noise as a false "turn-on" command, causing a remote-controlled water well pump to cycle on and off needlessly.

== Mitigation ==
Some systems that use tone signaling require higher reliability and less probability of falsing. One method of reducing falsing uses formats with simultaneous, paired tones. In decoding dual tones such as ICAO's SelCall, Quik Call I, MF, or DTMF, pairs of decoders are used and their outputs are connected to logical and circuitry. When tones are decoded, they are submitted to the and logic. If both are decoded at the same time, the and logic output shows a decoded pair of tones is present. To false in a dual-tone system, both decoders would have to false at the same moment. Two-out-of-five code and similar methods provide an additional check in some applications.

Another method is to subject tone decoding to a time constraint. In the case of Quik Call I or a string of DTMF digits, the falsing would have to occur in the exact order required to actuate the decoder. This is much more improbable than falsing in a single tone decoder. In two-tone sequential, tone and voice radio paging, decoders are actuated by decoding one tone and then a second in the proper sequence. Falsing could only occur if the two decoders falsed in a valid sequence within the decoder's time constraints. Examples of systems of two-tone sequential paging are Motorola Quik Call II, General Electric Mobile Radio Type 99, and later-model Plectron receivers.
