= Direct distance dialing =

Telecommunication service

Direct distance dialing (DDD) is a telecommunications service in North America by which a caller may call any other subscriber outside the local calling area without operator assistance. DDD was introduced in the United States in 1951, on a trial basis, with service from Englewood, New Jersey. Direct long-distance dialing by subscribers requires extra digits, called an area code, to be dialed as prefixes to the directory telephone number of the destination. International Direct Distance Dialing (IDDD) extends the system beyond the geographic boundaries of the North American Numbering Plan (NANP).

== History ==
The first direct-dialed long-distance telephone calls were possible in the New Jersey communities of Englewood and Teaneck. Customers of the ENglewood 3, ENglewood 4 and TEaneck 7 exchanges, who could already dial telephone numbers in the New York City area, could place calls to eleven major cities across the United States by dialing the three-digit area code and the seven-digit directory number. Local telephone numbers still consisted of the first two letters of the central office name and five digits. On November 10, 1951, Englewood mayor M. Leslie Denning made the first customer-dialed long-distance call, to Mayor Frank Osborne of Alameda, California.

The destinations, and their area codes, equipped with a long-distance toll-switch at that time were:

- 617: Boston, Massachusetts
- 312: Chicago, Illinois
- 216: Cleveland, Ohio
- 313: Detroit, Michigan
- 414: Milwaukee, Wisconsin
- 415: Oakland, California
- 215: Philadelphia, Pennsylvania
- 412: Pittsburgh, Pennsylvania
- 401: Providence, Rhode Island
- 916: Sacramento, California
- 318: San Francisco, California

Other areas could not yet be included in DDD as they did not have the necessary toll switching equipment, or because they still did not use a seven-digit local numbering plan. Montreal, Quebec, and Toronto, Ontario, in Canada, for example, had a mix of six- and seven-digit telephone numbers from 1951 to 1957, and did not have DDD until 1958. Whitehorse, Yukon, had seven-digit numbers starting in 1965, but the necessary switching equipment was not in place until 1972.

San Francisco required the special area code 318 due to temporary routing requirements. San Francisco and Oakland each had their own separate toll-switches, so calls had to be routed accordingly depending on the final destination. As the telephone equipment used at the time could only handle three-digit translation, the temporary use of area code 318 was required to distinguish between the two areas. Area code 318 was temporarily used to specify San Francisco and areas north of the Golden Gate, while calls with destinations in Oakland and the East Bay continued to use area code 415. When the electromechanical card-translator box became available in the 1952–53 period, six-digit translation became possible and the use of area code 318 was no longer required. Area code 318 was reclaimed for future use (now used as an area code for northern Louisiana), and the entire San Francisco Bay Area returned to using area code 415.

== Hardware ==
The No. 4 Crossbar switching system had been introduced in the early 1940s to switch four-wire circuits and replace the incoming operator. With semiautomatic operation analogous to the early days of the panel switch, the operator in the originating city used a multifrequency keypad to dial an access code to connect to the correct city and to send the seven-digit number to incoming equipment at the terminating city. This design was further refined to serve DDD.

The card sorter of the 4A/CTS (Number 4A Crossbar / Card Translator System) allowed six-digit translation of the central office code number dialed by the customer. This determined the proper trunk circuits to use, where separate circuit groups were used for different cities in the same area code, as in the case of Oakland and San Francisco. The new device used metal cards similar in principle to computer punched cards, and they were rapidly scanned as they fell past a light beam. CTS machines were called 4A (Advanced) if the translator was included in the original installation, and 4M (Modified) if it was added later. A 1970s version of 4XB, the 4A/ETS, used a computer to translate. For international dialing, Traffic Service Position System (TSPS) provided the extra computer power.

The reach of DDD was limited due to the inefficiency and expense of switching equipment, and the limited ability to process records of completed calls. An early obstacle was that the majority of switching systems did not provide Automatic Number Identification (ANI). Common control switches, such as the 1XB switch, were fairly quickly retrofitted to provide ANI, and most 5XB switches were initially installed with ANI services. Panel switch were eventually retrofitted, as were some step-by-step systems that were not scheduled for immediate replacement. Even if a switch had ANI, it could not identify callers on party lines. This was only partly overcome by tip-party identification for two-party lines. As the cost of subscriber line carrier declined, party lines were gradually phased out.

As this and other improved technologies became available, as well as Automatic Message Accounting (AMA) computers to process the long-distance records into customer bills, the reach of DDD was slow in the 1950s, but quickened in the early 1960s. Electronic switching systems allowed electronic processing of the dialed digits, referring to electronic memories to determine call routing, and this has reached the state of the art, with digital telephone exchanges which are basically specialized computers that route voice traffic from one "peripheral" to another as digital data. Call routing can now be done based on the area code, central office code and even the first two digits of the line number, although routing based on digits past the central office code is usually limited to cases of competitive local exchange carriers, number pooling and number portability.

== IDDD ==
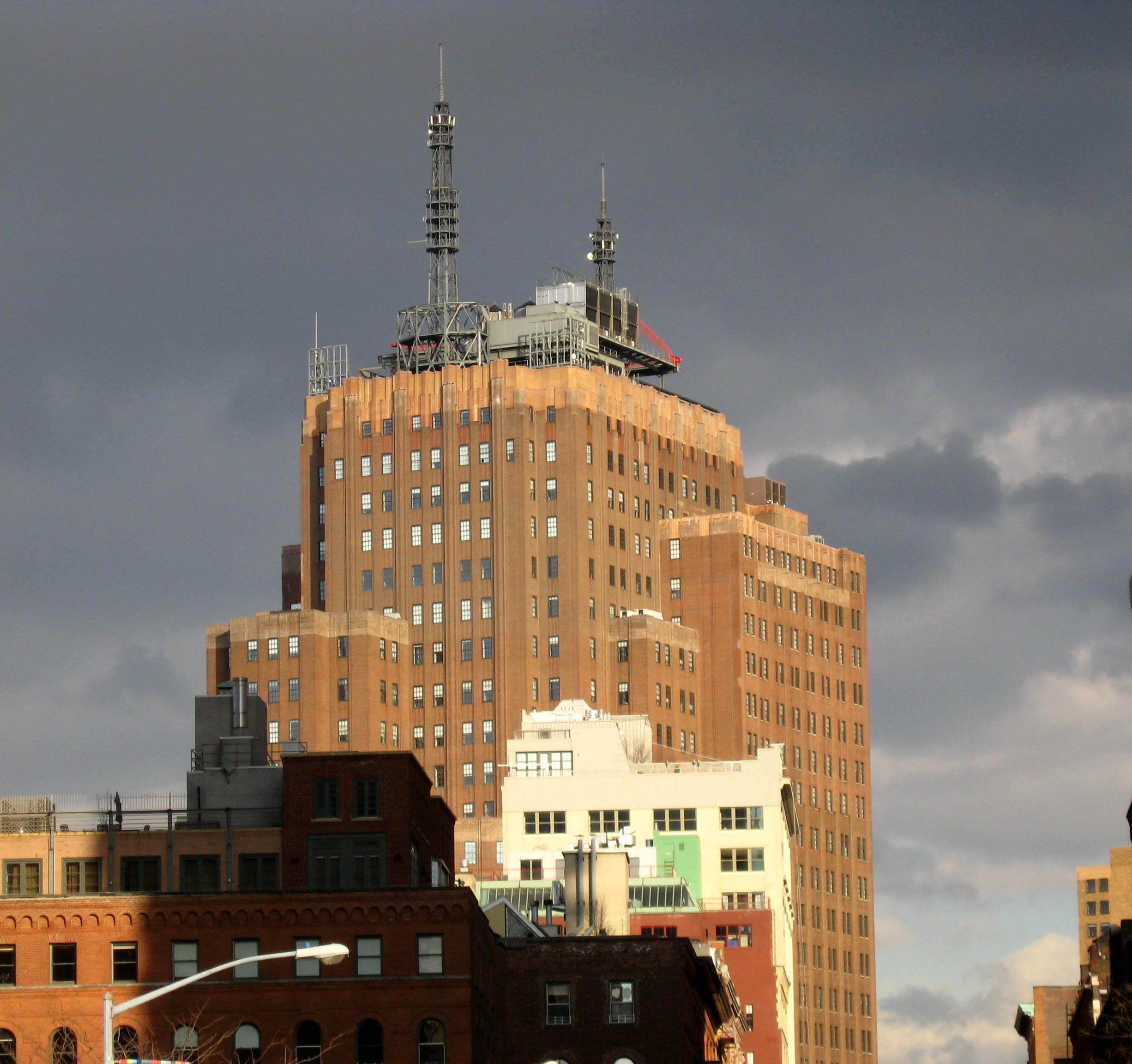
AT&T Long-Distance Building

In the 1960s, with the domestic conversion still underway, plans were laid to extend Direct Distance Dialing beyond North America (including a number of the Caribbean Islands). Some subscribers could already directly dial transatlantic telephone calls to certain destinations as early as in 1957 over the recently completed Atlantic cable to England. A new systematic extension of Direct Distance Dialing was developed and was introduced as International Direct Distance Dialing (IDDD) in March 1970.

With so much new equipment already working that could not handle more than the requisite ten-digit telephone numbers of DDD, the new system was based on designs by which most toll offices did not have to store and forward the whole international telephone number. Gateway offices were set up in New York, London and Paris, connected to the ordinary automatic toll network. The New York gateway was at 32 Avenue of the Americas. The new LT1 5XB switch on the tenth floor of 435 West 50th Street received new originating registers and outgoing senders able to handle fifteen-digit telephone numbers, with appropriate modifications to completing markers and other equipment. Other 5XB switches in the next few years were installed with IDDD as original equipment, and in the 1970s ESS offices also provided the service.

The key to the new system was two-stage multi-frequency pulsing. The outgoing sender sent its Class 4 toll center an off-hook signal as usual, received a wink as usual as a "proceed to send" signal, and outpulsed only a special three-digit (later six-digit) access code. The toll center picked a trunk through the long-distance network to the gateway office, which sent a second wink to the originating office, which then sent the whole dialed number. Thus the toll switching system needed no modification except at the gateway. The international trunks used Signaling System No. 5, a "North Atlantic" version of the North American multi-frequency signaling system, with minor modifications including slightly higher digit rate. European MF systems of the time used compelled signaling, which would slow down too much on a long transoceanic connection.

In the 1970s, toll centers were modified by adding the Traffic Service Position System (TSPS). With these new computers in place, digit storage in the toll system was no longer a problem. End offices were less extensively modified, and sent all their digits in a single stream. TSPS handled the gateway codes and other complexities of toll connections to the gateway office.

== Equivalent service in the United Kingdom ==
In the United Kingdom and other parts of the Commonwealth of Nations, an equivalent service to direct distance dialing is subscriber trunk dialing (STD), and ISD for international subscriber trunk dialing. Queen Elizabeth II inaugurated STD on 5 December 1958, when she dialed a call from Bristol to Edinburgh and spoke to the Lord Provost.

== See also ==
- 1958 in the United Kingdom
