= Compelled signalling =

Class of telecommunications signalling protocols

Compelled signalling is a class of telecommunications signalling protocols that acknowledge the receipt of each discrete signal before the next signal can be sent.

For example, in register signalling in Signalling System R2, the transmission of each signal involves the following five events:

- The outgoing trunk begins sending the tones that correspond to the signal it wishes to convey in the forward direction;
- The incoming trunk, once it has correctly detected the initiating signal, begins sending a set of confirmation tones in the backward direction;
- The outgoing trunk, once it has correctly detected the confirmation tones, stops sending the signal tones in the forward direction;
- The incoming trunk, once it has correctly detected the end of the signal tones (that is: that the forward channel is now silent) stops sending its confirmation tones in the backward direction;
- Before being able to begin sending the next signal, if any, the outgoing trunk needs to ensure that it is receiving silence on the backward channel.

The method is only relevant in the case of signalling systems that use discrete signals (e.g. a combination of tones to denote a digit), as opposed to signalling systems that are message-oriented, such as Signaling System 7 (SS7) and ISDN Q.931, where each message is able to convey multiple items of information (e.g. multiple digits of the called telephone number).

Compelled signalling is not suitable for satellite communication due to the long propagation delay.

The opposite of compelled signalling is referred to as non-compelled signalling. DTMF is an example, where the originating side sends tones and silence in the forward direction, without being able to ascertain whether each tone has been correctly received by the terminating side. To minimise the risk of signalling errors, minimum durations are imposed, both on the tones and on the intervening periods of silence.
