= Selective calling =

Method in two-way radio system

In a conventional, analog two-way radio system, a standard radio has noise squelch or carrier squelch, which allows a radio to receive all transmissions. Selective calling is used to address a subset of all two-way radios on a single radio frequency channel. Where more than one user is on the same channel (co-channel users), selective calling can address a subset of all receivers or can direct a call to a single radio. Selective calling features fit into two major categories—individual calling and group calling. Individual calls generally have longer time-constants: it takes more air-time to call an individual radio unit than to call a large group of radios.

Selective calling is akin to the use of a lock on a door. A radio with carrier squelch is unlocked and will let any signal in. Selective calling locks out all signals except ones with the correct "key", in this case a specific digital code. Selective calling systems can overlap; e.g. a radio may have CTCSS and DTMF calling.

Selective calling prevents the user from hearing others on a shared channel. It does not eliminate interference from co-channel users (other users on the same radio channel). If two users try to talk at the same time, the signal will be affected by the other party using the channel.

Some selective calling systems experience falsing. In other words, the decoder activates when a valid signal is not present. Falsing may come from a maintenance problem or poor engineering.

== Group calling ==
In conventional FM two-way radio systems, the most common form of selective calling is CTCSS, which is based on a sub-audible tone. One implementation of this system is by Motorola and is called Private Line, or PL. Radios made by nearly any manufacturer will work acceptably with existing systems using CTCSS. The system allows groups of radios to remain muted while other users are talking on the channel. In business and industrial systems, as many as 50 sets of users could share the same channel without having to listen to calls for each other's staffs. In government systems, users can avoid having to hear users outside their own agency. (Government channels are usually separated by distance between user groups. Only one local user group is assigned to a channel.)

In uses where missed calls are allowable, selective calling can also hide the presence of interfering signals such as receiver-produced intermodulation. Receivers with poor specifications—such as scanners or low-cost mobile radios—cannot reject the unwanted signals on nearby channels in urban environments. The interference will still be present and will still degrade system performance but by using selective calling the user will not have to hear the noises produced by receiving the interference.

In the United States, Federal Communications Commission rules require users of selective calling to monitor the channel, i.e. switch to carrier squelch before transmitting. In other words, the user must monitor (listen) to make sure the channel is not in use by someone on another selective calling code before transmitting. To enforce this rule, base stations often have a monitor switch on the microphone. The push-to-talk button is split into two segments. One segment turns the selective calling off. The other segment of the button transmits. A mechanical interlock prevents the transmit button from being pressed until the monitor button is down. This is called "compulsory monitor before transmit". In mobile radios, microphones are stored in a hang-up box. When the microphone is pulled out of the hang-up, the radio reverts to carrier squelch and the selective calling feature is disabled. The user automatically monitors—verifies no one else is using the channel—by pulling the microphone out of the hang-up box. Hand-held radios sometimes have LED indicators that show when the channel is in use.

=== CTCSS ===
CTCSS (Continuous Tone-Coded Squelch System) superimposes any one of about 50 continuous audio tones on the transmitted signal, ranging from 67 to 254 Hz. At any time when the transmitter is on, the tone is encoded on the signal. CTCSS is often called PL tone (for Private Line, a trademark of Motorola), or simply tone squelch. General Electric's implementation of CTCSS is called Channel Guard (or CG). When RCA was in the land mobile radio business, their brand name was Quiet Channel (or QC). Tone codes may universally be described by their tone frequency (for example, 131.8 Hz).

=== SelCall ===
SelCall
Example of a CCIR-format call.

Selcall (Selective Calling) transmits a burst of five in-band audio tones to initiate the conversation. This feature is common in European systems. In a simplex system, the 5-tone just opens the speaker of the desired partner. In a repeater system, another CTCSS or tone-burst or 5-tone is needed to activate the company's repeater, depending on the systems design. If the called radio is within reach of the sender, it answers the incoming call with its stored receipt tone. Sometimes systems using Selcall are referred to as CCIR or ZVEI, specific tone encoding schemes used in Selcall systems. On the continent, people use the ZVEI scheme while in Great Britain the CCIR is very common.

In the same way that a single CTCSS tone would be used on an entire group of radios, a single five-tone sequence is used in a group of radios. All radios also have their own private callnumber stored, to be reached for an individual conversation instead of a group call. In either way the radio speaker turns on as soon as the fifth tone of a valid sequence is decoded. In case of a group call, a short announcement tone is generated on the radios speaker. In case of a private call, the receipt tone is transmitted back to the sender and then the receive path is open. The speaker stays on until the carrier squelch detects that the carrier is no longer being received. At that point, the speaker mutes and the decoder resets. The receiver speaker turns off and remains muted until another valid five-tone sequence is decoded.

A similar tone format is used for one-way tone-and-voice radio paging in the US. It is informally known as Reach format.

=== DCS ===
DCS or Digital-Coded Squelch superimposes a continuous stream of FSK digital data, at 134.5 baud, on the transmitted signal. In the same way that a single CTCSS tone would be used on an entire group of radios, the same DCS code is used in a group of radios. DCS is also referred to as DPL tone (for Digital Private Line, a trademark of Motorola), and likewise, GE's implementation of DCS is referred to a Digital Channel Guard (or DCG).

Some equipment uses a 136 Hz square wave turn off code. The turn-off signal is sent for one- to three-tenths of a second (100–300 ms) at the end of a transmission to mute the audio so that a squelch crash is not heard. Radios with DCS options are generally compatible provided the radio's encoder-decoder will use the same code as radios in the existing system. Codes are usually described as three octal digits (for example, 054). Some DCS codes are inverted data of others: one code with the marks and spaces inverted may form a different valid DCS code (413 is equivalent to 054 inverted). Because of the use of the 136 Hz code, many receivers will decode a DCS signal when tuned to the CTCSS tone of 136.5 Hz (depending on receiver system tolerance).

=== XTCSS ===
XTCSS is the newest signaling technique and it provides 99 codes with the added advantage of 'silent operation'. XTCSS fitted radios are purposed to enjoy more privacy and flexibility of operation. XTCSS is implemented using a combination of CTCSS and in-band signaling.

=== Tone burst or single tone ===
Tone burst sound
Single tone or tone burst selective calling audio example.

Tone burst is an obsolete method of selective calling where the radio transmits a single 0.5- to 1.5-second audio tone at the beginning of each transmission. This scheme existed before circuitry for CTCSS had been developed. This method was in wide use in the United States from the 1950s through the 1980s. Human spaceflight operations made frequent use of this method.

In the same way that a single CTCSS tone would be used on an entire group of radios, a single burst tone is used in a group of radios. The radio speaker turns on as soon as the tone is decoded and the speaker stays on until the carrier squelch detects that the carrier is no longer being received. At that point, the speaker mutes and the decoder resets. The receiver speaker turns off and remains muted until another valid burst tone is decoded.

In some cases, burst tones were used to select repeaters. By changing tones, the mobile radio would actuate a different repeater site. A typical tone scheme might use the tones 1,800 Hz, 2,000 Hz, 2,200 Hz, 2,400 Hz, and 2,552 Hz. This was the scheme used by most State of California agencies during the era when tone burst was in use. Some systems have been observed to use tones as low as 800 Hz. The default or standard five Motorola tones used for single tone format as of the 1980s: 1,350 Hz, 1,500 Hz, 1,650 Hz, 1,800 Hz, 1,950 Hz. These were identified in system documentation for a number of remote control equipment models as well as sales brochures for Motorola Syntor and Micor mobile radio Systems 90 accessories. A common tone burst frequency used by many amateur radio systems in Europe is 1,750 Hz.

In German public service radio networks the calltone 1,750 Hz (Tone I) and 2,135 Hz (Tone II) are used to activate different repeaters or call an operator. To double the calling features, tones are used in short call (1,000 ms) and long call (> 2,000 ms).

In well-designed systems, repeaters or radios usually included an audio notch filter that reduced the volume of the tone at the speaker.

A variation to the single tone scheme was seen in one-way paging receivers. In some two-tone sequential systems, sending 4–8 seconds of the second tone pages all receivers which have a code including the second tone. This is sometimes referred to as long tone B. Receivers made by Plectron and often used to page volunteer firefighters use a long single tone. The decoder in the typical Plectron receiver would not decode the tone as a valid call unless it was present for at least two to four seconds (a very long variation of the burst tone).

== Conventional analog individual calling ==
In individual calling, a specific radio is called. Most individual calling schemes involve a sequence of tones. Most schemes have a dozen to thousands of possible individual codes. As a practical matter, more than about two hundred radios on a single channel make an unusable level of traffic. So 1,000 individual calls will usually be more than needed.

Individual calls are usually event-based. For example, a tow truck may be called to give the driver an assignment or an ambulance may be called with an emergency call.

Some Motorola pagers could decode four different individual 5-tone signals (see SelCall above). Some fire departments used this feature to implement an individual signal (using the first of the four signals), a station based signal (i.e. paging everyone from one fire station, using the second signal), a region-based signal (i.e., everyone in the northwest region, using the third signal), and an all-call (every fireman, using the fourth signal).

=== DTMF ===
In dual-tone multi-frequency (DTMF) selective calling, the radio is alerted by a string of digits. Systems typically use 2- to 7-digits. These can be dialed from a traditional telephone dial connected to a radio or may be generated as a string of DTMF digits by an automatic encoder. In some systems, a dispatching computer is connected to a DTMF encoder via a serial (RS-232) cable: the computer sends commands to the encoder that generates a pre-defined digit string that is then sent to the transmitter.

On FM two-way radios, digits are usually sent at a level that equals two-thirds, (66%,) of system deviation. For example, in a ±5 kHz deviation system, the DTMF encoder is set to produce 3.3 kHz of transmitter deviation (modulation), or less. In systems with solid received signals, tone levels are sometimes set very low so radio users are not forced to listen to them at a high level. Keeping the DTMF tone modulation below 2/3 system maximum preserves the clean sine wave produced by the encoder. Sending digits at higher levels causes the transmitter's circuits that are designed to prevent over-modulation to distort or clip the waveform of the tones. Distorted wave forms may not decode properly or may include harmonics that cause falsing. Digits are usually sent at a minimum of 55 milliseconds (ms) in length with at least 55 ms of silence between each digit. Some decoders may require much longer-duration digits. DTMF digits consist of paired tones: a row tone and a column tone. The levels of row and column tones must be similar in order for a decoder to interpret them reliably.

Radios with DTMF decoders may monitor all system traffic or remain muted until called, depending on the system design. When the radio receives the correct digit string, it may momentarily buzz or sound a Sonalert. An indicator light may turn on and remain latched on. In most systems, the radio's receive audio would latch on after receiving a valid digit string if normally muted.

Many companies have trademarked names for their DTMF features. For example, Motorola calls their DTMF options, Touch Call. Because DTMF is a standardized format, most of the features are interchangeable. Generally, any radio that is equipped to decode the digit string 0-1-2-3 would be compatible with any system using DTMF.

DTMF P-T-T ID
Example of DTMF used as push-to-talk ID on a two-way radio system.

Some systems use DTMF for push-to-talk unit ID. Each time the push-to-talk is pressed, the radio sends a string of DTMF digits. Each radio has a unique string of digits. This allows the base station to know who last called or who last pressed the push-to-talk.

=== Two-tone sequential ===
Tone and voice paging example
Sound of a two-tone sequential dial up paging terminal.

Two-tone sequential, also known as 1+1, is a selective calling method originally used in one-way, tone-and-voice paging receivers. Many companies have their own names for two-tone sequential options. General Electric Mobile Radio called it Type 99. Motorola called it Quik-Call II. For example, the encoder sends a single tone followed by 50 to 1,000 milliseconds of silence and then a second tone. Decoders look for a valid first tone followed by a valid second tone within a defined length of time, (a time window). For example, a decoder detecting a valid first tone might allow up to 2 seconds for a valid second tone to be decoded. If no valid second tone is decoded within 2 seconds, the decoder resets and waits for another valid first tone.

A widely varied set of tone plans or schemes are used for these systems. Some tone plans use tone frequencies which are close or overlap with tones used by other coding plans. For example, one plan might use very narrow filters and specify a tone of 702.3 Hz. Another may use a simple filter of capacitors and inductors and specify a tone of 700 Hz. A decoder might not be able to tell the difference between these two tones because they are so close in frequency. Systems generally use tones off of a single, designed tone plan. Individual tone plans are engineered to avoid overlapping or nearby tone frequencies that may cause falsing. Some systems use CTCSS subaudible tones as the tones composing the two-tone sequence. For example, a two tone sequence might consist of 123.0 Hz followed by 203.5 Hz.

On FM two-way radios, tones are usually sent at a level that equals two-thirds of system deviation. For example, in a ±5 kHz deviation system, the tone encoder is set to produce 3.3 kHz of transmitter deviation, (modulation,) or less. Because the tones are audible, in systems with solid received signals, tone levels are sometimes set lower so that radio users are not forced to listen to them at a high level. Keeping the tone modulation below 2/3 system maximum preserves the clean sine wave produced by the encoder. Sending digits at higher levels causes the transmitter's circuits that are designed to prevent over-modulation to distort or clip the waveform of the tones. Distorted wave forms may not decode properly or may include harmonics that cause falsing. Tones are usually sent at a minimum of 500 milliseconds (ms) to 3 seconds (3,000 ms) in length.

Radios with two-tone sequential decoders may monitor all system traffic or remain muted until called, depending on the system design. When the radio receives the correct tones in the proper sequence, it may momentarily buzz or sound a Sonalert. An indicator light may turn on and remain latched on. In most systems, the radio's receive audio would latch on if normally muted. In systems using a combination of audible tone sequences and CTCSS, it is common practice to turn off the CTCSS encode while the two-tone sequence is sent. This means system users with CTCSS decoders do not have to listen to the paging tones.

=== Quik-Call I ===
Quik-Call I
Two Quik-Call I sequences.

Quik-Call I, also known as 2+2, is a selective calling method originally used in one-way paging receivers. The Quik-Call name is a trademark of Motorola. It sends a pair of tones followed by 50 to 1,000 milliseconds of silence and then a second pair of tones. Decoders look for a valid first tone pair followed by a valid second tone pair within a defined length of time, (a time window). For example, a decoder detecting a valid first tone pair might allow up to 2 seconds for a valid second tone pair to be decoded. If no valid second tone is decoded within 2 seconds, the decoder resets and waits for another valid first tone pair. The system is less susceptible to falsing because it employs pairs of tone decoders that must detect valid tone pairs simultaneously.

Quik-Call I is most famous for use in fire departments. The 1970s television show, Emergency!, depicted its use for base station ringdowns in the Los Angeles County Fire Department. In some systems, mobile radios had decoder options built into them. In Motorola mobile equipment, the decoders were housed in a box that bolted onto the radio control head. In the 1960s, it was also used to actuate tube-type receivers used to call out volunteer firefighters or to trigger sirens used to call out volunteers.

Radios with Quik-Call I decoders may monitor all system traffic or remain muted until called, depending on the system design. When the radio receives the correct tone pairs in the proper sequence, it may momentarily buzz or sound a Sonalert. An indicator light may turn on and remain latched on. In most systems, the radio's receive audio would latch on if normally muted. In the Emergency! television show, the decoder turned on the lighting, activated the overhead loudspeakers, activated the horn/klaxon, and probably turned off cooking appliances.

=== MDC-600 and MDC-1200 ===
MDC-1200 sounds
leading push-to-talk ID with data muting.

MDC-1200 sounds
leading push-to-talk ID without data muting.

MDC, also known as MDC-1200 and MDC-600, is a low-speed Motorola data system using audio frequency shift keying, (AFSK). MDC-600 uses a 600 baud data rate. MDC-1200 uses a 1,200 baud data rate. Systems employ either one of the two baud rates. Mark and space tones are 1,200 Hz and 1,800 Hz. The data are sent in bursts over the radio system's voice channel.

Motorola radios with MDC options have an option allowing the radio to filter out data bursts from the receive audio. Instead of hearing the AFSK data, the user hears a short chirp from the radio speaker each time a data burst occurs. (The user must turn on this feature in the radio's option programing settings).

MDC signaling includes a number of features: unit ID, status buttons, emergency button, and selective calling. These features are programmable and could be used in any combination desired by the user. They are typically incorporated in high-end analog FM radios made by Motorola. In addition to Motorola, two other companies make compatible base station decoders for MDC-1200.

== Other in-band signaling ==
=== Modat ===
MODAT push-to-talk ID
Example of pick up and delivery truck radio traffic using Modat unit ID.

Modat, also written MODAT, is an obsolete Motorola data system using a sequence of seven audio tones similar to the five-tone-sequential Selcall format. Some systems still use Modat today. Modat is used for unit ID and emergency buttons, rather than for selective calling. In a typical installation, each radio in a system is assigned a unique seven-tone code. Each time the radio's push-to-talk button is pressed, the radio transmits the seven tone sequence at the beginning of the transmission. To prevent the user from talking while the tone sequence is broadcast, the seven-tone sequence is played over the two-way radio receiver's speaker.

Modat tone sequences are described as either a six-digit or seven-character string. For example, a single Modat code could be described as either 698R124 or 6988124 (where the "R" tone indicated "repeat the last digit"). The data format coming from a Modat decoder is unclear.

Modat features are programmable and could be used in any combination desired by the user. For example, some systems use only push-to-talk unit ID or only emergency button. Others may use both. One setting that is adjustable is the length of time from push-to-talk press until the tone sequence starts. This delays the start of the tone sequence to allows systems with long time constants in CTCSS decoders or voting comparators to open an audio path. In addition to Motorola, other companies make add-on encoders that can modify a different brand of radio to work with a Modat system.

Modat unit ID systems are frequently heard from radios on Barbour television productions, such as the Cops television show, portraying southern California law enforcement agencies in the 1980s.

== Out-of-band individual calling ==
Trunked radio systems have built-in unit ID and selective calling features. Each trunked system has its own unique features. See the article for a specific system to learn more.

Two-way radio systems using digital modulation schemes such as TDMA can embed unit ID and selective calling into the data stream multiplexed in parallel with the voice. See the article pertaining to a specific system to learn more.
