= Cue tone =

A cue tone is a message consisting of audio tones, used to prompt an action.

In broadcast networks, a DTMF cue tone or subaudible tone was traditionally used to prompt insertion of a local TV commercial or radio advertisement by the broadcast automation equipment at the broadcast station or cable headend. This has been replaced in the IPTV with digital cue tones (typically SCTE-35 streams in North America).

Cue tones were also used on broadcast carts (cartridge tapes) to cue local equipment to start and stop, particularly to cue the tape player itself, as the tape runs in an endless loop and often contains several segments of content.

== See also ==
- BTSC
- Show control
