= Frank Osborne (California politician) =

American politician

Frank P. Osborn was an American politician and the mayor of Alameda, California. In 1951 he was the recipient of the first long-distance phone call to use the direct distance dialing telephone facility, dialed by Mayor M. Leslie Denning of Englewood, New Jersey.

Osborn served two terms as mayor. He sat on the city council between 1943 and 1953.
