= Multi-frequency receiver =

Multi-Frequency signalling, (MF), is similar to the European version, CCITT Signaling System 5, (SS5). The original format was five tones used in pairs. This later evolved to six tones. Because its six tones are used only in pairs, this signaling format is sometimes referred to as "two-out-of-five code" or "two of six."

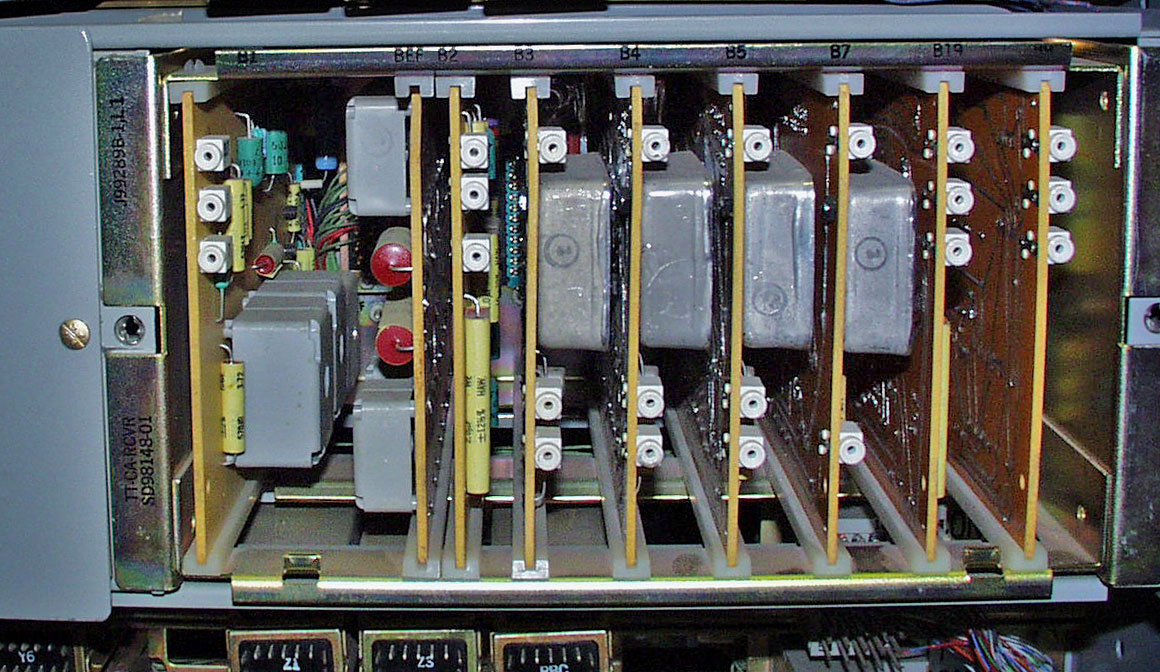
DTMF receiver, late 1960s, in a crossbar exchange

Multi-Frequency receivers have been present in US telephony at least since the late 1940s. In 1940s technology, receivers in 4XB and similar equipment used vacuum tubes. Later ones used RC filters and transistors. Digital filters became commonplace in electronic switching systems of the 1980s. For example, in 5ESS switch such jobs are done by DSPs in the Global Digital Services Unit (GDSU).
