= Multi-frequency signaling =

Signaling method for telephony

In telephony, multi-frequency signaling (MF) is a type of signaling that was introduced by the Bell System after World War II. It was in use since before 1949. It uses a combination of audible tones for address (telephone number) transport and supervision signaling on trunk lines between central offices. The signaling is sent in-band over the same channel as the bearer channel used for voice traffic.

Multi-frequency signaling defines electronic signals that consist of a combination of two audible frequencies, usually selected from a set of six frequencies. Over several decades, various types of MF signaling were developed, including national and international varieties. The CCITT standardization process specified the American Bell System version as Regional Standard No. 1, or Signalling System R1, and a corresponding European standard as Signalling System R2. Both were largely replaced by digital systems, such as Signalling System 7, which operate out-of-band on a separate data network.

Because of the in-band transmission characteristic of MF signaling, the systems proved vulnerable to misuse and fraud by phone phreaking with devices such as a blue box.

Multifrequency signaling is a technological precursor of dual-tone multi-frequency signaling (DTMF, Touch-Tone), which uses the same fundamental principle, but was used primarily for signaling address information and control signals from a user's telephone to the wire-center's Class-5 switch. DTMF uses a total of eight frequencies.

== Operation ==
Multi-frequency dialing
How multi-frequency dialing sounds.

Digits are represented by two simultaneous tones selected from a set of five (MF 2/5), six (MF 2/6), or eight (MF 2/8) frequencies. The frequency combinations are played, one at a time for each digit, to the remote multi-frequency receiver in a distant telephone exchange. MF is used for signaling in trunking applications.

Using MF signaling, the originating telephone switch sends a start signal to seize the line, taking the circuit off-hook. The terminating office acknowledges the seizure with a ready state by responding with a wink start signal, which is a momentary off-hook condition. The originating office then sends address information to the terminating switch. In R1 MF signaling this address information normally is a KP tone, the numeric digits of the destination number, and an ST tone to indicate the end of the address. Other information may also be added, such as the caller's number, using KP2 as a delimiter.

MF is a type of in-band signaling. Depending on the type and configuration of switching equipment, it may or may not be audible to the telephone user, but the technology was vulnerable to abuse with a method called phreaking with a blue box which generates the tones required to control remote telephone switches.

== Multi-frequency signals ==
Multifrequency signals
| Code | 700 Hz | 900 Hz | 1100 Hz | 1300 Hz | 1500 Hz | 1700 Hz |
|---|---|---|---|---|---|---|
| 1 | Yes | Yes | | | | |
| 2 | Yes | | Yes | | | |
| 3 | | Yes | Yes | | | |
| 4 | Yes | | | Yes | | |
| 5 | | Yes | | Yes | | |
| 6 | | | Yes | Yes | | |
| 7 | Yes | | | | Yes | |
| 8 | | Yes | | | Yes | |
| 9 | | | Yes | | Yes | |
| 0/10 | | | | Yes | Yes | |
| 11/ST3 | Yes | | | | | Yes |
| 12/ST2 | | Yes | | | | Yes |
| KP | | | Yes | | | Yes |
| KP2 | | | | Yes | | Yes |
| ST | | | | | Yes | Yes |

The minimum timings of signals were initially at least 27 milliseconds per digit with 20 millisecond spacing. KP required at least 55 milliseconds as a precaution against activation of the sender by transients mimicking the KP signal.

Reliability of the signal increased with slower timing, like most signals. The timing was therefore variable from these minimae, with later authors suggesting a 100 millisecond KP.

== Demise ==
In-band signaling fell into disfavor in the public switched telephone network (PSTN) as electronic switching systems displaced electro-mechanical switching systems, but legacy offices may still exist in some countries that are still using some electromechanical and other legacy switching equipment.

Out-of-band Common Channel Signaling (CCS) became nearly universal by the end of the 20th century in the United States. Benefits include higher connection establishment rate and better fraud security.

Most 911 Public Safety Answering Points (PSAPs) use the MF format to identify the calling party to the PSAP when processing calls from Mobile Telephone Switching Offices (MTSOs) and landline telephone exchanges. This is based on an earlier system which used MF to identify the calling party to a feature group 'D' (101xxxx) alternate long-distance provider.

== See also ==
- Signaling System No. 5
- Two-out-of-five code
