= Signaling (telecommunications) =

Exchange of information required to set up a telecommunications connection

In telecommunications, signaling is the use of signals for controlling communications. This may constitute an information exchange concerning the establishment and control of a telecommunication circuit and the management of the network.

A signaling protocol is a type of communications protocol for encapsulating the signaling between communication endpoints and switching systems to establish or terminate a connection and to identify the state of the connection.

== Classification ==
Signaling systems may be classified based on several principal characteristics.

=== In-band and out-of-band signaling ===
In the public switched telephone network (PSTN), in-band signaling is the exchange of call control information within the same physical channel, or within the same frequency band, that the message (the callers' voice) is using. An example is dual-tone multi-frequency signaling (DTMF), which is used on most telephone lines to customer premises.

Out-of-band signaling is telecommunication signaling on a dedicated channel separate from that used for the message. Out-of-band signaling has been used since Signaling System No. 6 (SS6) was introduced in the 1970s, and also in Signalling System No. 7 (SS7) in 1980 which became the standard for signaling among exchanges internationally.

In the mid-20th century, supervision signals on long-distance trunks in North America were primarily in-band, for example at 2600 Hz, necessitating a notch filter to prevent interference. Late in the century, all supervisory signals had been moved out of band. With the advent of digital trunks, supervision signals are carried by robbed bits or other bits in the E1-carrier dedicated to signaling.

=== Line versus register signaling ===
Line signaling is concerned with conveying information on the state of the line or channel, such as on-hook, off-hook (answer supervision and disconnect supervision, together referred to as supervision), ringing, and hook flash. Register signaling is concerned with conveying addressing information, such as the calling and/or called telephone number. In the early days of telephony, with operator handling calls, the addressing formation is by voice as "Operator, connect me to Mr. Smith please". In the first half of the 20th century, addressing formation is done by using a rotary dial, which rapidly breaks the line current into pulses, with the number of pulses conveying the address. Finally, starting in the second half of the century, address signaling is by DTMF.

=== Channel-associated versus common-channel signaling ===
Channel-associated signaling (CAS) employs a signaling channel that is dedicated to a specific bearer channel.

Common-channel signaling (CCS) employs a signaling channel which conveys signaling information relating to multiple bearer channels. These bearer channels, therefore, have their signaling channel in common.

=== Compelled signaling ===
Compelled signaling refers to signaling where the receipt of each signal from an originating register needs to be explicitly acknowledged before the next signal can be sent.

Most forms of R2 register signaling are compelled, while R1 multi-frequency signaling is not.

The term is only relevant in the case of signaling systems that use discrete signals (e.g. a combination of tones to denote one digit), as opposed to signaling systems which are message-oriented (such as SS7 and ISDN Q.931) where each message is able to convey multiple items of information (e.g. multiple digits of the called telephone number).

=== Subscriber versus trunk signaling ===
Subscriber signaling refers to the signaling between the telephone and the telephone exchange. Trunk signaling is the signaling between exchanges.

== Examples ==
Every signaling system can be characterized along each of the above axes of classification. A few examples:

- DTMF is an in-band, channel-associated register signaling system. It is not compelled.
- SS7 (e.g., TUP or ISUP) is an out-of-band, common-channel signaling system that incorporates both line and register signaling.
- Metering pulses (depending on the country, these are 50 Hz, 12 kHz or 16 kHz pulses sent by the exchange to payphones or metering boxes) are out-of-band (because they do not fall within the frequency range used by the telephony signal, which is 300 through 3400 Hz) and channel-associated. They are generally regarded as line signaling, although this is open to debate.
- E and M signaling (E&M) is an out-of-band channel-associated signaling system. The base system is intended for line signaling, but if decadic pulses are used it can also convey register information. E&M line signaling is, however, usually paired with DTMF register signaling.
- By contrast, the L1 signaling system (which typically employs a 2280 Hz tone of various durations) is an in-band channel-associated signaling system as was the SF 2600 hertz system formerly used in the Bell System.
- Loop start, ground start, reverse battery and revertive pulse systems are all DC, thus out of band, and all are channel-associated since the DC currents are on the talking wires.

Whereas common-channel signaling systems are out-of-band by definition, and in-band signaling systems are also necessarily channel-associated, the above metering pulse example demonstrates that there exist channel-associated signaling systems which are out-of-band.

== Protocols ==
A signaling protocol is a type of communications protocol for encapsulating the signaling between communication endpoints and switching systems to establish or terminate a connection and to identify the state of the connection.

The following is a list of signaling protocols:

- ALOHA
- Digital Subscriber System No. 1 (EDSS1)
- Dual-tone multi-frequency signaling
- H.248
- H.323
- H.225.0
- Jingle
- Media Gateway Control Protocol (MGCP)
- Megaco
- Regional System R1
- NBAP (Node B Application Part)
- Signalling System R2
- Session Initiation Protocol
- Signaling System No. 5
- Signaling System No. 6
- Signaling System No. 7
- Skinny Client Control Protocol (SCCP, Skinny)
- Q.931
- QSIG

== See also ==
- Control character
- In-band control
- Metadata
- Out-of-band control
