= DTMF signaling =

Telecommunication signaling system

Dual-tone multi-frequency signaling
- DTMF keypad and tones
- Abbreviation: DTMF
- Status: Active
- Year started: 1963; 63 years ago
- Committee: ITU-T
- Authors: Bell Laboratories
- Website: ITU-T Recommendation Q.23

Dual-tone multi-frequency (DTMF) signaling is a telecommunication signaling system using the voice-frequency band over telephone lines between telephone equipment and other communications devices and switching centers. DTMF was first developed in the Bell System in the United States, and became known under the trademark Touch-Tone for use in push-button telephones, starting in 1963. The DTMF frequencies are standardized in ITU-T Recommendation Q.23. The signaling system is also known as MF4 in the United Kingdom, as MFV in Germany, and Digitone in Canada.

Touch-tone dialing with a telephone keypad gradually replaced the use of rotary dials and has become the industry standard in telephony to control equipment and signal user intent. The signaling on trunks in the telephone network uses a different type of multi-frequency signaling.

Employed in a variety of use-cases, one common usage of DTMF signaling is in many intercom door systems, where the signal is used to unlock the door remotely.

== Multifrequency signaling ==
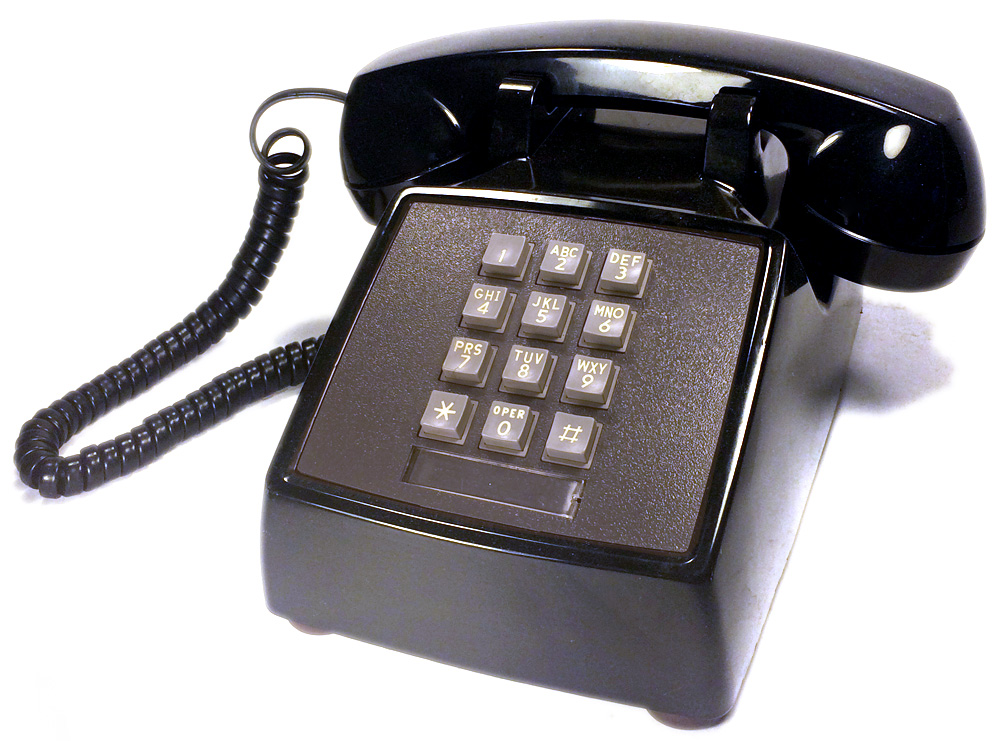
The Western Electric 2500, a typical late 20th century American touch-tone telephone

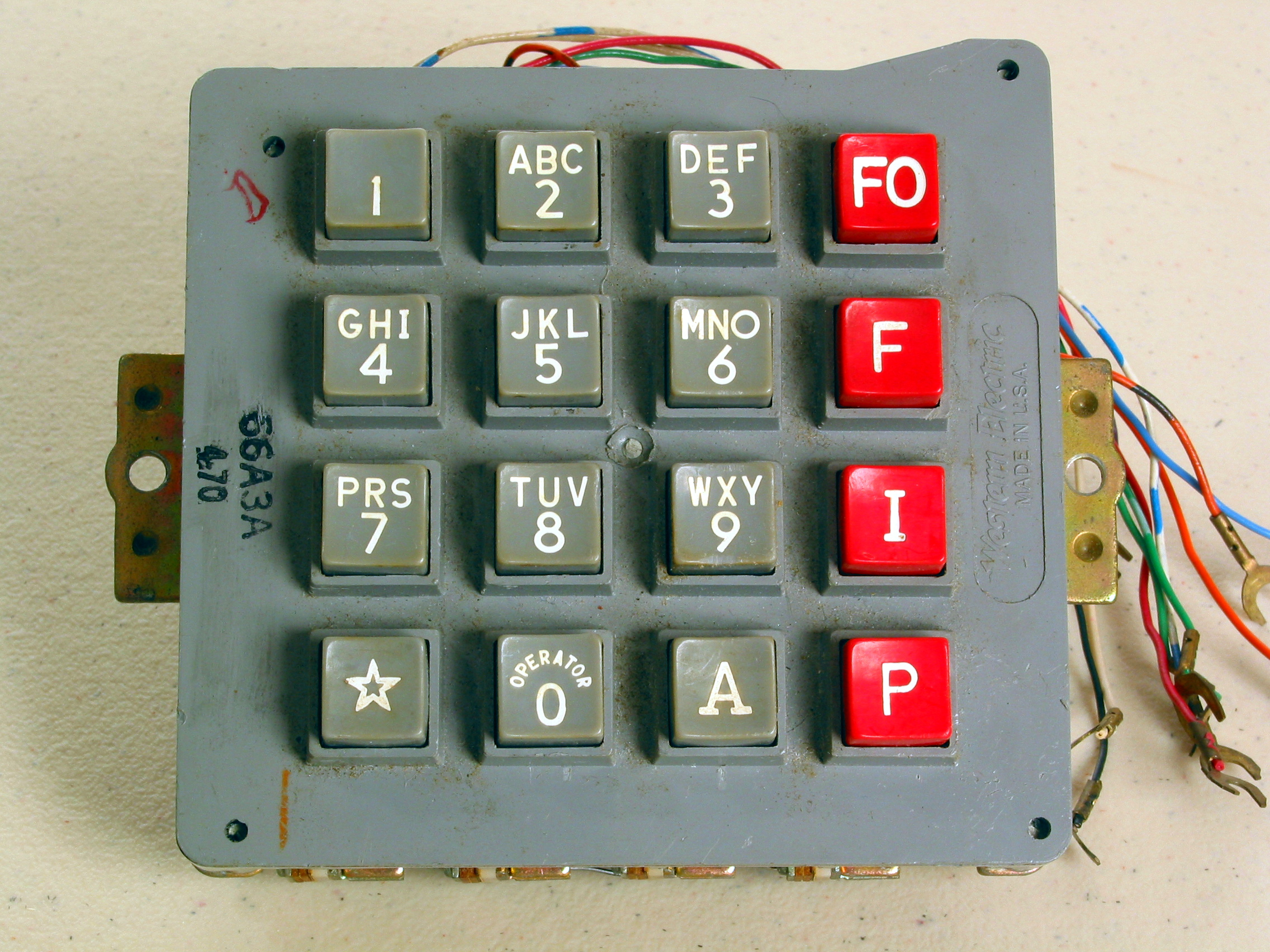
Autovon keypads were a typical application for use of all sixteen DTMF signals. The red keys in the fourth column produce the A, B, C, and D DTMF events.

Before the development of DTMF, telephone numbers were dialed with rotary dials for loop-disconnect (LD) signaling, also known as pulse dialing. It functions by interrupting the current in the local loop between the telephone exchange and the calling party's telephone at a precise rate with a switch in the telephone that operates the dial which spins back to its rest position after having been rotated to each desired digit. The exchange equipment responds to the dial pulses either directly by operating relays, or by storing the digits in a register that records the dialed telephone number. Pulse dialing was possible only on direct metallic lines and was limited in physical distance by the amount of electrical distortions present. For signaling over trunks between switching systems, operators used a different type of multi-frequency signaling.

Multi-frequency signaling (MF) is a group of signaling methods that use a mixture of two pure tone (pure sine wave) sounds. Various MF signaling protocols were devised by the Bell System and CCITT. The earliest of these were for in-band signaling between switching centers, where long-distance telephone operators used a 16-digit keypad to input the next portion of the destination telephone number in order to contact the next downstream long-distance telephone operator. This semi-automated signaling and switching proved successful in both speed and cost effectiveness. Based on this prior success with using MF by specialists to establish long-distance telephone calls, dual-tone multi-frequency signaling was developed for end-user signaling without the assistance of operators.

The DTMF system uses two sets of four frequencies in the voice frequency range transmitted in pairs to represent sixteen signals, representing the ten digits and six additional signals identified as the letters A to D, and the symbols # and *. As the signals are audible tones, they can be transmitted through line repeaters and amplifiers, and over radio and microwave links.

AT&T described the product as "a method for pushbutton signaling from customer stations using the voice transmission path". To prevent consumer telephones from interfering with the MF-based routing and switching between telephone switching centers, DTMF frequencies differ from all of the pre-existing MF signaling protocols between switching centers: MF/R1, R2, CCS4, CCS5, and others that were later replaced by SS7 digital signaling. DTMF was known throughout the Bell System by the trademark Touch-Tone. The term was first used by AT&T in commerce on July 5, 1960, and was introduced to the public on November 18, 1963, when the first push-button telephone was made available to the public. As the parent company of Bell Systems, AT&T held the trademark from September 4, 1962, to March 13, 1984. It is standardized by ITU-T Recommendation Q.23.

Other vendors of compatible telephone equipment called the Touch-Tone feature tone dialing or DTMF. Automatic Electric (GTE) referred to it as "Touch-calling" in their marketing. Other trade names such as Digitone were used by the Northern Electric Company in Canada.

As a method of in-band signaling, DTMF signals were also used by cable television broadcasters as cue tones to indicate the start and stop times of local commercial insertion points during station breaks for the benefit of cable companies. Until out-of-band signaling equipment was developed in the 1990s, fast, unacknowledged DTMF tone sequences could be heard during the commercial breaks of cable channels in the United States and elsewhere. Previously, terrestrial television stations used DTMF tones to control remote transmitters. In IP telephony, DTMF signals can also be delivered as either in-band or out-of-band tones, or even as a part of signaling protocols, as long as both endpoints agree on a common approach to adopt.

== Keypad ==
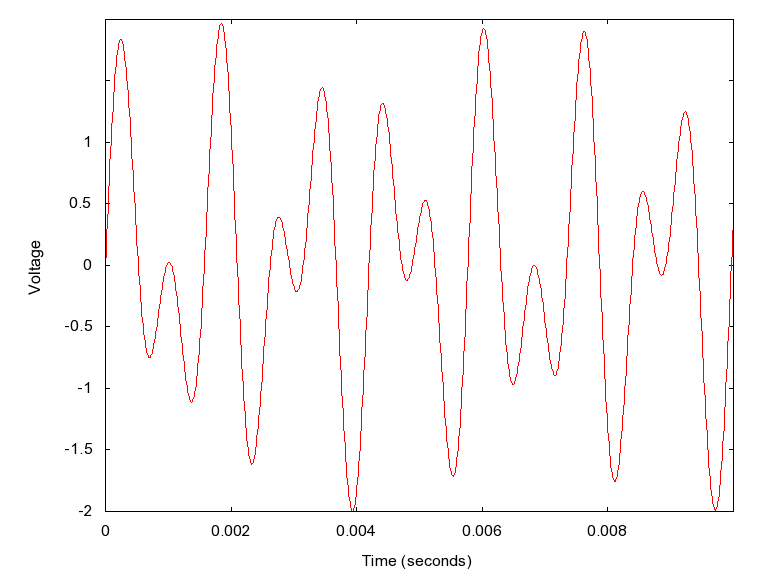
Combination of 1209 Hz and 697 Hz sine waves, representing DTMF "1"

The DTMF telephone keypad is laid out as a matrix of push buttons in which each row represents the low-frequency component and each column represents the high-frequency component of the DTMF signal. The commonly used keypad has four rows and three columns, but a fourth column is present for some applications. Pressing a key sends a combination of the row and column frequencies. For example, the 1 key produces a superimposition of a 697 Hz low tone and a 1209 Hz high tone. Initial pushbutton designs employed levers, enabling each button to activate one row and one column contact. The tones are decoded by the switching center to determine the keys pressed by the user.

DTMF keypad frequencies (with sound clips)
High tone Low tone	1209 Hz	1336 Hz	1477 Hz	1633 Hz
697 Hz	1	2	3	A
770 Hz	4	5	6	B
852 Hz	7	8	9	C
941 Hz	*	0	#	D

== Square, star, A, B, C, and D ==
DTMF dialing
audio output of a DTMF signal.

Engineers had envisioned telephones being used to access computers and automated response systems. They consulted with companies to determine the requirements. This led to the addition of the square sign which is typically approximated by the number sign (#) (alternatively pound, diamond, hash, gate (UK), or octothorpe) in the fourth row of the third column of keys, and the star (*) key, or asterisk (France) in the fourth row of the first column. In addition, a fourth column of keys was added for menu selection: A, B, C and D. The lettered keys were dropped from most keypads and it was many years before the two symbol keys became widely used for vertical service codes such as *67 in the United States and Canada to suppress caller ID.

Public payphones that accept credit cards use these additional codes to send the information from the magnetic strip.

The AUTOVON telephone system of the United States Armed Forces used signals A, B, C, and D to assert certain privilege and priority levels when placing telephone calls. Precedence is still a feature of military telephone networks, but using number combinations. For example, entering 93 before a number is a priority call.

Present-day uses of the signals A, B, C and D are rare in telephone networks, and are exclusive to network control. For example, A is used in some networks for cycling through a list of carriers.. The signals are used in radio phone patch and repeater operations to allow, among other uses, control of the repeater while connected to an active telephone line.

The signals star, square, A, B, C, and D are still widely used worldwide by amateur radio operators and commercial two-way radio systems for equipment control, repeater control, remote-base operations and some telephone communications systems.

DTMF signaling tones may also be heard at the start and/or end of some prerecorded VHS videocassettes. Information on the master version of the videotape is encoded in the DTMF tones. The encoded tones provide information to automatic duplication machines, such as format, duration and volume levels in order to replicate the original video as closely as possible.

DTMF tones are used in some caller ID systems to transfer the caller ID information, a function that is performed in the United States by Bell 202 modulated frequency-shift keying (FSK) signaling.

== Decoding ==
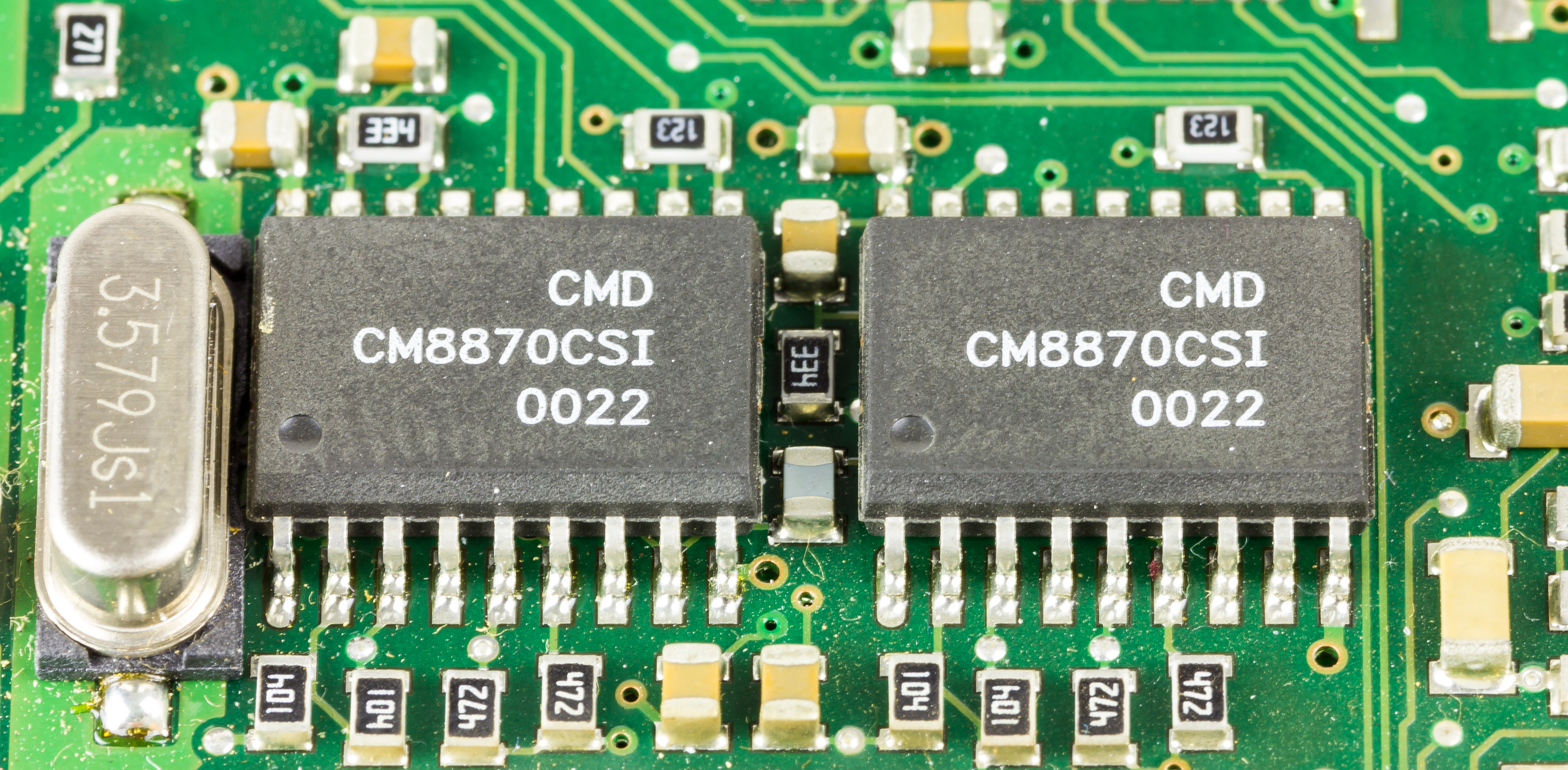
Two CMD CM8870CSI DTMF receivers

DTMF was originally decoded by tuned electrical filter banks. By the end of the 20th century, digital signal processing became the predominant technology for decoding. DTMF decoding algorithms typically use the Goertzel algorithm, although application of the MUSIC algorithm to DTMF decoding has been shown to outperform Goertzel and being the only possibility in cases when the number of available samples is limited. As DTMF signaling is often transmitted in-band with voice or other audio signals present simultaneously, the DTMF signal definition includes strict limits for timing (minimum duration and interdigit spacing), frequency deviations, harmonics, and amplitude relation of the two components with respect to each other (twist).

== Other multiple frequency signals ==
Telephone systems typically define other tones, outside the DTMF specification, that indicate the status of lines, equipment, or the result of calls, and for control of equipment for troubleshooting or service purposes. Such call-progress tones are often also composed of multiple frequencies and are standardized in each country. The Bell System defined them in the Precise Tone Plan.

Some early modems were based on touch-tone frequencies, such as Bell 400-style modems.

== See also ==
- Binary-coded decimal
- Cue tone
- Selective calling
