= Signalling System R2 =

Signalling System R2 is a signalling protocol for telecommunications that was in use from the 1960s mostly in Europe, and later also in Latin America, Asia, and Australia, to convey exchange information between two telephone switching systems for establishing a telephone call via a telephone trunk. It is suitable for signaling on analog as well as digital circuits.

R2 signaling specifications were first published by the International Telegraph and Telephone Consultative Committee (CCITT) in ITU White Book Volume VI of 1969, and are maintained by the International Telecommunication Union Telecommunication Standardization Sector (ITU-T) in Recommendations Q.400 through Q.490. The name R2 is a derived from a designation as Regional System No. 2.

R2 signaling methods may be logically divided into two protocol groups. The line signaling group comprises supervisory signals for call setup and termination, while interregister signaling uses in-band multifrequency signals to transfer calling-party and called-party addressing information.

== Signaling information ==
A signalling protocol may be visualized by two contexts: the information it conveys, and the location of participants in the network.

Each R2 national variant conveys at least the following. Forward is the direction from the dialling telephone's switch to the called telephone's switch, and backward is the inverse direction:

R2 at a glance
line signalling	acquisition (termed seizure) of an idle DS0 channel
forward register signalling	the digits 1 through 10 of the destination telephone number (termed called-party address)
forward register signalling	the digits 1 through 10 of the origin telephone number (termed calling-party address)
forward register signalling	the digits 11 through 14 for special-service requests (e.g., route to operator, add echo-suppression)
forward register signalling	the calling party's category (e.g., normal subscriber, high-priority subscriber, operator, coin-operated telephone)
forward register signalling	the disposition of the routing of the telephone call attempt (e.g., called-party's telephone is currently busy, called-party's telephone is now ringing, called-party's telephone is out of service)
line signalling	the called party has now lifted the handset from its hook to answer this call attempt in order to transition from R2 signalling toward the establishment of speech-capable audio to fully establish the call (termed going off hook)
line signalling	the release of the call (e.g., the handset of the called-party's telephone has now been returned to its on-hook position, ending this call; the telephone company or trouble in the network is explicitly or implicitly forcing the ending of this call)
backward register signalling	the set of explicit requests corresponding to each of the forward register-signalling data. The client–server requesting of each of these data differentiates R2 from the Bell System R1 MF-tone signalling, where in R1 the called-party's switch unilaterally sends some of these data as a timed sequence without explicit intervening requests from the calling-party's switch.

== Line signalling ==
R2 line signalling is a family of protocols that govern the resource acquisition and resource release related to a two-party telephone call attempt and, if successful, the establishment of a two-party telephone call. Although in the 1960s R2 line signalling was represented as electrical pulses on a two-wire or four-wire circuit, by the latter 1970s these analog electrical pulses also could be represented in digital form by a signalling DS0 channel in the trunk, which is normally channel 16 in an E1 trunk.

== Register signalling ==
R2 register signalling is a family of protocols that communicates addressing information during the addressing phase and how the call attempt turned out during the disposition phase. In the 1960s, R2 register signalling was represented by electromechanical devices that generated and detected multi-frequency audio tones. By the late-1970s, these began to be replaced by digitized PCM audio in DS0 channels of an E1.

== Standards ==
R2 signalling refers to a vast number of variants of R2 that resemble each other to varying degrees. For most R2 variants, each such variant of R2 is promulgated by the PTT of each nation and/or by a telecommunications equipment manufacturer who addressed that national market with a nation-specific adaptation of one of their products.

The international version of R2 is an inter-nation protocol for R2 signalling that crosses national boundaries, and is neither a superset nor a subset of any national variant of R2. Conversely, each national variant of R2 is intra-nation. The international standard R2 was first promulgated by CEPT in the 1970s and then later by ITU-T with only modest evolution.

== Signalling variants ==
R2 line signalling variants that support R2 line signalling in its electrical-pulse form by dedicated two-wire or four-wire circuits usually represent each signal as two different pulse lengths (e.g., 150 milliseconds versus 600 milliseconds), where the two different meanings of those two different pulse lengths varies by context.

R2 line signalling variants that support R2 line signalling in its digital form via the A, B, C, and D bits in DS0 channel #16 of an E1 fall into two general categories: those that use only the A bit to represent each signal and those that use multiple A, B, C, and D bits to represent each signal, with using only two, the A bit and the B bit being by far the most common. Those that use only the A bit, strongly resemble the analog electrical R2 line signalling, where each signal is a timed pulse that differs by length of time that the pulse is in the high voltage (i.e., one-valued bit) state before returning to the untimed resting voltage state (i.e., zero-valued bit). Those that use multiple bits to represent each signal usually are stateful in that time of exhibition of that bit pattern typically plays no role in conveying meaning.

== Multifrequency tones ==
All R2 register signalling variants use a combination of two frequencies of audio signals. Each pair of frequencies is called a multi-frequency tone, or MF tone. Each call attempt has an origination end and a termination end, both to the multi-span call as well as for each span within that multi-span call routing. The origination end is called the outgoing register in R2 parlance. The termination end is called the incoming register in R2 parlance. The outgoing register transmits forward MF tones to the incoming register. The incoming register transmits backward MF tones to the outgoing register. The outgoing register detects backward MF tones arriving from the incoming register. The incoming register detects forward MF tones arriving from the outgoing register. The outgoing register transmits the first signal, but from that point forward the outgoing register merely passively responds to the prompting driven by each signal transmitted by the incoming register. (In apt modern-era proleptic terms, the outgoing register's first push signal to the incoming register is similar to a peer-to-peer message, whereas the incoming register's pull signals, which request information from the outgoing register, are client–server, where the client is the incoming register and the server is the outgoing register.)

== Nomenclature ==
R2 is a mnemonic for Regional System No. 2. Regional System No. 1, R1, was the CCITT designation for North American multi-frequency signaling (MF) practiced in the Bell System, although in practice that term is rarely used for MF signalling.

Later in the 20th century, use of R2 signalling spread beyond Europe to all regions of the globe, including Mexico on the North American continent.

The European market consisted of a large number of national telecommunications administrations, but unlike the Bell System, these were not usually integrated with an equipment manufacturer. Instead a large number of independent vendors of equipment emerged in Europe though the 20th century in a very competitive market, tendering for business from European PTTs. A more open set of technical standards developed, particularly under the auspices of CEPT and later ETSI. This allowed interconnection, interoperability and communication between a more diverse range of equipment types and telecommunication administrations.

European equipment vendors such as Ericsson, Siemens and the European ITT affiliates, amongst others became major suppliers to telecommunication administrations around the world bringing technologies like Ericsson’s ARF and ITT’s Pentaconta crossbars to many markets. European derived standards were adopted more readily around the world than the proprietary standards of Bell System and Western Electric. As a result, R2 has even found sparse use in Canada, which is largely under the influence of Bell System standardization.

R2 signalling was also used for register signaling within many European switching systems of that era, notably in Ericsson’s AR- crossbar systems. It was used for inter station communication and for communication between parent and remote switches.

== See also ==
- Compelled signalling
