= In-band control =

In-band control is a characteristic of network protocols with which data control is regulated. In-band control passes control data on the same connection as main data. Protocols that use in-band control include HTTP and SMTP. This is as opposed to Out-of-band control used by protocols such as FTP.

== Example ==
Here is an example of an SMTP client-server interaction:

Server: 220 example.com  
Client: HELO example.net  
Server: 250  Hello example.net, pleased to meet you  
Client: MAIL FROM: <jane.doe@example.net>  
Server: 250 jane.doe@example.net... Sender ok  
Client: RCPT TO: <john.doe@example.com>  
Server: 250 john.doe@example.com ... Recipient ok  
Client: DATA  
Server: 354 Enter mail, end with "." on a line by itself  
Client: Do you like ketchup?  
Client: How about pickles?  
Client: .  
Server: 250 Message accepted for delivery  
Client: QUIT  
Server: 221 example.com closing connection

SMTP is in-band because the control messages, such as "HELO" and "MAIL FROM", are sent in the same stream as the actual message content.

== See also ==
- Out-of-band control
