= Out-of-band control =

Computer networking concept

Out-of-band control is a method used by network protocols for sending control information (commands, logins, or session signals) separately from the main data, improving reliability and preventing interference.

File Transfer Protocol (FTP) employs an out-of-band approach, using one connection for control commands, like logging in or requesting files, and a separate connection for transferring the files themselves.

== See also ==
- Out-of-band management
- In-band control
