= Register signaling =

Telecoms protocols carrying telephone number data

In telecommunications, register signaling provides addressing information, such as the calling and/or called telephone number. R2 register signaling is an example.

This is contrasted with line signaling.
