= Common-channel signaling =

In telecommunications, common-channel signaling (CCS), or common-channel interoffice signaling (CCIS), is the transmission of control information (signaling) via a separate channel than that used for the messages, The signaling channel usually controls multiple message channels.

In the public switched telephone network (PSTN) one channel of a communications link is typically used for the sole purpose of carrying signaling for establishment and tear down of telephone calls. The remaining channels are used entirely for the transmission of voice messages. In most cases, a single 64 kbit/s channel is sufficient to handle the call setup and call clear-down traffic for numerous bearer (voice and data) channels.

The technical alternative to CCS is channel-associated signaling (CAS), in which each bearer channel has a dedicated signaling channel.

CCS offers the following advantages over CAS, in the context of the PSTN:

- Faster call set-up time
- Greater trunking efficiency due to the quicker set up and clearing, thereby reducing traffic on the network
- Can transfer additional information along with the signaling traffic, providing features such as caller ID
- Signaling can be performed mid-call

The most common CCS signaling methods in use are Integrated Services Digital Network (ISDN) and Signalling System No. 7 (SS7).

ISDN signaling is used primarily on trunks connecting end-user private branch exchange (PBX) systems to a central office. SS7 is primarily used within the PSTN. The two signaling methods are very similar since they share a common heritage and in some cases, the same signaling messages are transmitted in both ISDN and SS7.

== Common channel signaling networks ==
A CCS network provides signaling message transfer for participating Common Channel Signaling Switching Offices (CCSSOs), databases, and operator systems. It is a packet-switched communication network that allows call control and transaction messages from the voice and data networks to be transferred on communications paths that are separate from the voice and data connections.

CCS messages provide for transaction-based services and for call control signaling between network nodes. The architecture for a CCS network is generally based on the geographical location of signaling points, the number and sizes of signaling points, the expected traffic load, and the services to be provided by the network.

Regardless of the type of architecture selected, the CCS network will consist of a combination of the following components:

- Signaling Link - A communication path between two adjacent Signaling Points (SPs) in the CCS network.
- Link Set - A set of signaling links that connects the same pair of adjacent signaling points.
- Combined Link Set - A collection of link sets from a signaling node over which message traffic to a given destination is shared.
- Signaling Point (SP) - An SP transmits, receives, and processes CCS(SS7) messages. An SP can be a Signaling End Point (SEP) or a Signaling Transfer Point (STP).
- Signaling Transfer Point (STP) - An SP that performs message routing functions and provides switching of messages between SEPs.
- Signaling End Point (SEP) - An SP, other than an STP, with the ability to serve as a source or a sink for CCS messages.
- Service Control Point (SCP) - An SEP that acts as a database to provide information to another SEP, e.g., a Service Switching Point (SSP) or another SCP, for processing and/or routing certain types of network calls.
- Signaling Gateway - Responsible for exchanging SS7 messages over a set of links from an SS7 node in a Voice Over Packet (VOP) network to a traditional PSTN network and encapsulating the user information (either ISUP for call setup or SCCP/TCAP for service related signaling) contained in the message for distribution to the Call Control Agent (CCA).
- Internet Call Router (ICR) - Also called the Internet Offload, the ICR is a new network element used in the “post-switch" off-load architecture.
- Switch - An SEP that is equipped to switch end user voice or data calls.
- Combined Node (CN) – An SP that combines the functions of two or more types of SPs.
- A-Link Concentrator (ALC) - An SP that has the Message Transfer Part (MTP) functionality of an STP and also serves as a CCSSO.

=== Interconnecting CCS networks ===
As CCS networks have continued to evolve, and network interconnection architectures and the services they support have grown more complex, it has become necessary to identify the type of behavior all network providers are expected to exhibit when specific requirements do not exist.

Providers of Interconnecting CCS networks and other interconnecting networks need information about the processes and interfaces that need to be supported to ensure that call originations routed via other interconnecting networks receive at least the same quality of service as intranetwork calls.

Telcordia GR-905, Common Channel Signaling Network Interface Specification (CCSNIS) Supporting Network Interconnection, Message Transfer Part (MTP), and Integrated Services Digital Network User Part (ISDNU), contains this important information and includes information for providers of Legacy Network Gateway and Legacy Selective Router Gateway systems to support the delivery of emergency calls between legacy origination networks and IP-enabled PSAPs, as well as emergency calls routed via Emergency Services IP Networks (ESInets) and legacy PSAPs that are served by Selective Routers. It provides explicit references to ANSI and ATIS Standards and ITU-T Recommendations.
