= Line signaling =

Line signaling is a class of telecommunications signaling protocols. Line signaling is responsible for off-hook, ringing signal, answer, ground start, on-hook unidirectional supervision messaging in each direction from calling party to called party and vice versa. After an off-hook, line signaling initiates register signaling to accomplish the exchange of telephone numbers of called party and in more modern line-signaling protocols, the calling party as well. While register signaling occurs, line signaling remains quiescent unless the calling party goes on-hook or an abnormal cessation of the call occurs, such as due to equipment malfunction or shutdown or due to network outage upstream in that call-attempt's series of spanned trunks.

Line signaling can be conveyed in a single DS0 channel of a trunk. In modern PCM telecommunications, line signaling is represented by the ABCD bits in DS0 #16 of an E1 or a selected DS0 within a T1.

Line signaling can also be conveyed within the channels being supervised, as in the original T1 scheme which used one out of every eight bits for supervision, or with robbed bits of a superframe format, or as in-band signaling, e.g. as in L1 signaling where 2280 Hz tone pulses are used.
