= PCI =

PCI may refer to:

== Business and economics ==
- Payment card industry, businesses associated with debit, credit, and other payment cards
  - Payment Card Industry Data Security Standard, a set of security requirements for credit card processors
- Provincial Competitiveness Index, a governance index of Vietnamese provinces
- Ceridian-UCLA Pulse of Commerce Index, a U.S. economic indicator based on trucking fuel consumption
- Per capita income
- Equitable PCI Bank, a Philippine bank

== Science and technology ==
- Panel call indicator, telephone signalling system
- Pavement condition index, used in transportation civil engineering
- Perturbational Complexity Index, a scalar measure of consciousness level in neurological patients.
- Picocurie (pCi), a unit of radioactivity
- Peripheral Component Interconnect, a computer bus
  - PCI-X (PCI eXtended), a computer bus
  - PCI Express (PCIe), a computer bus
- Projects of Common Interest, a category of EU projects for interconnecting energy infrastructures
- Protocol-control information, in telecommunication
- Pulverized coal injection method, in blast furnaces

=== Medicine ===
- Percutaneous coronary intervention, a set of procedures used to treat coronary heart disease
- Photochemical internalization, a light-triggered drug delivery method
- Potato carboxypeptidase inhibitor, a natural peptide usable for thrombolytic and cancer therapy
- Prophylactic cranial irradiation, a management option for certain types of aggressive cancers
- Protein C inhibitor, a serine protease inhibitor

== Organizations ==
- Paralympic Committee of India, which selects athletes to represent India at international athletic meets
- Parti Communiste Internationaliste, a French political party
- Partito Comunista Italiano, a former Italian communist party
- Peer Community in, communities of researchers reviewing and recommending preprints in their field
- Pentecostal Collegiate Institute (New York), 1900–1903, US
- Pentecostal Collegiate Institute (Rhode Island), 1902–1918, US
- Pharmacy Council of India, a statutory body in India
- Porter and Chester Institute, a technical school in Connecticut and Massachusetts, US
- Post Carbon Institute, an organization advocating a more resilient, equitable, and sustainable world
- Presbyterian Church in Ireland, a Protestant denomination in Ireland
- Partito Comunista Italiano, an Italian communist party
- Progetto Civico Italia, an Italian reformist party
- Project Concern International, a humanitarian organization
- Public Communications Inc., a Chicago-based national public relations agency

== Other uses ==
- Duruwa language (ISO 639-3 code)

== See also ==
- PPCI (disambiguation)
- Pavement condition index
