= PCCI =

PCCI may refer to:

== Organizations and businesses ==
- Pensacola Christian College, Inc.
- Philippine Chamber of Commerce and Industry, the official chamber of commerce of the Philippines
- Plymouth Chamber of Commerce & Industry, the largest Chamber in the Southwest peninsula of England
- Pratt Center for Community Development, a university-based advocacy planning and assistance organization in Brooklyn, New York

== Science and technology ==
- Post-chemotherapy cognitive impairment, cognitive impairment that can result from chemotherapy treatment
- Premixed Charge Compression Ignition, a form of homogeneous charge compression ignition

== See also ==
- Porsche Carrera Cup Italia
- PCI (disambiguation)
- PPCI (disambiguation)
