= Director telephone system =

Telephone switching system used in the UK

The Director telephone system was a development of the Strowger or step-by-step (SXS) switching system used in London and five other large cities in the UK from the 1920s to the 1980s.

A large proportion (c. 70% to 80%) of telephone traffic in large metropolitan areas is outgoing traffic, and it is distributed over many exchanges. A non-director SXS exchange system is not suitable for these areas because of:

- Difficulty in operating the remaining local manual exchanges with all-number calling numbers for all subscribers.
- Many (generally more than ten) exchanges are of significant size in large cities.
- Only ten or less main exchanges accessible from first selection stage, and:
- Every main exchange would need direct junctions to and from all other main exchanges.
- All exchanges would require two or more selection stages for a call (and possibly two or more junctions required for a call), though in the Director system only one selection stage and one junction would be needed for busy routes before the local selection stages for the last four digits (i.e. two group selectors then the final selector).

In a distinguishing selector repeater (DSR) exchange the DSRs are held for the duration of the call but directors are only held for the call setting-up time of up to 30 seconds. A rack held only two rows of DSRs (ten per row) as against eight rows of ordinary group selectors.

But it would be possible to retain DSR satellite exchanges for small exchanges in a Director area temporarily or permanently if the limitation on outgoing junction routes was accepted and balanced against the need to provide up to eight groups of Directors. Siemens Brothers had mapped a possible system for a large city with either six or seven total digits.

As the translation facility incorporated was similar to the register in common control systems, the director system incorporates two features of the Panel system, which was introduced in large American cities, and which were required regardless of the type of exchange system for these large areas, which would have a mixture of manual and automatic exchanges for some years. Customer stations were assigned seven-digit numbers, with the first three digits spelling out the local exchange name; this expedited call handling particularly to and from manual exchanges. Direct or tandem junction routes to other exchanges could be allocated as required, with routing independent of the telephone number and able to be altered at any time to cater for traffic growth or the introduction of new local or tandem exchanges.

Each local exchange incorporated up to eight groups of directors which translated the first three digits (ABC digits) comprising the exchange name into a pulse train of one to six digits, as required for each exchange and unique to that exchange. The translated digits were sent to the code selectors, and then the four numeric digits were sent to three switching stages in the terminating exchange (two group selectors and a final selector). Hence local calls within the exchange and busy direct junction routes to exchanges with high traffic from that exchange could be trunked via one code selection stage, which reduced both the setting-up time and the total number of selectors required in the network. Distant exchanges which did not justify direct junction routes could be called via one or more tandem exchanges; being routed via one, two or three local code selectors in the originating exchange, one or more selectors in the tandem exchange(s), and finally the numeric selection stages in the terminating exchange for the last four digits, which were stored and forwarded without translation.

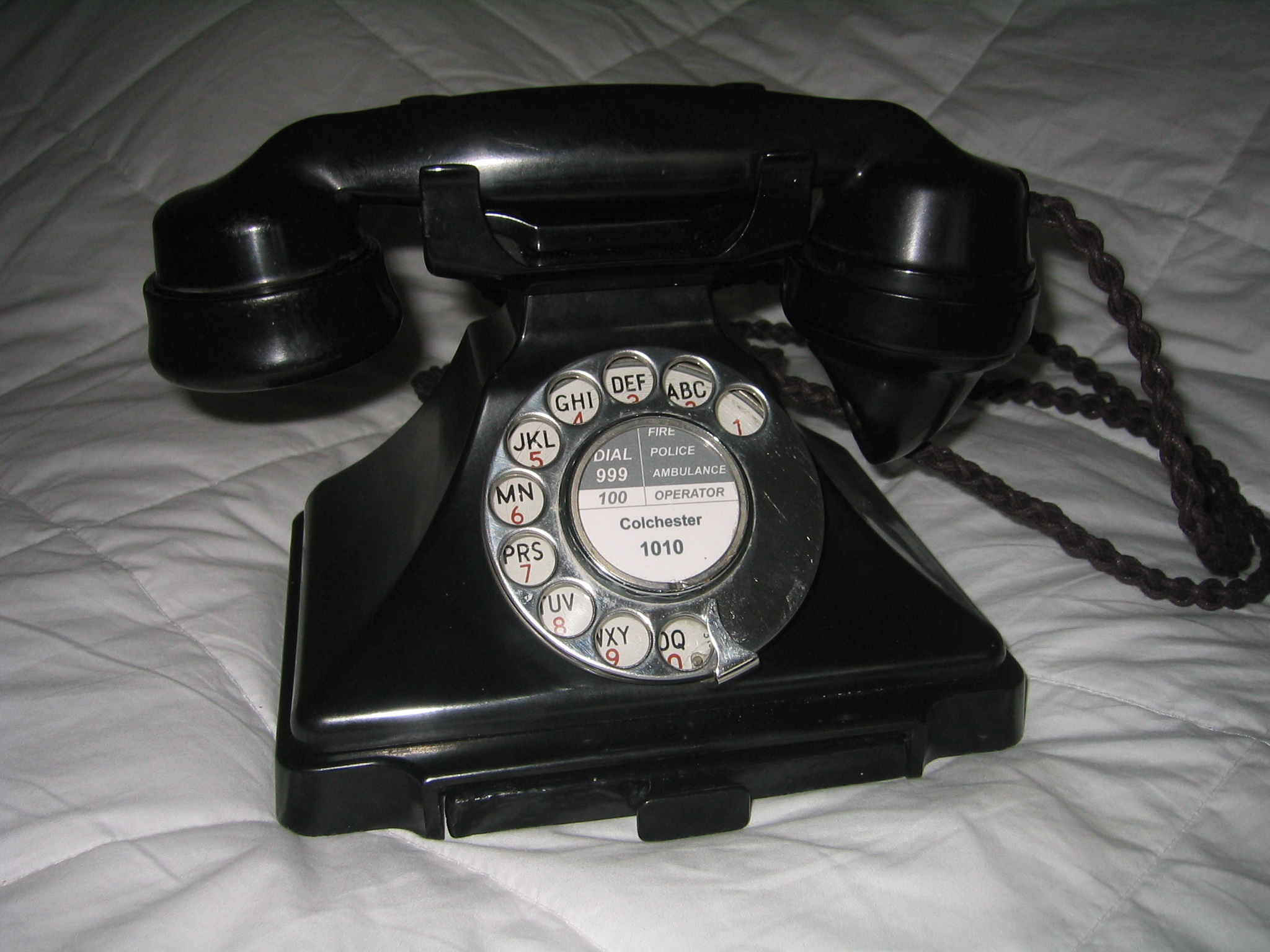
British (BPO) Type 232 phone of 1932

== Numbering plan ==
The telephone numbering plan for the Director system assigned seven-digit telephone numbers to subscriber stations. The first three digits were encoded as the first three letters of the local exchange name. The translation map of letters to digits was displayed directly on the telephone rotary dial, by grouping the letters with the corresponding digits. The British letter arrangement was similar to American dials, except that the letters "O" and "Q" mapped to digit 0, not 6: 1 (unmapped), 2 ABC, 3 DEF, 4 GHI, 5 JKL, 6 MN, 7 PRS, 8 TUV, 9 WXY, 0 OQ. The mapping of O and Q to 0 was to eliminate the possibility of a subscriber misdialling as a result of misreading a number.

A subscriber in Wimbledon, for example, would be assigned the number WIMbledon1234; the first three letters, written in capitals, indicated the exchange code to be dialled. The actual trains of pulses from the subscriber's dial were 9461234. The exchange code digits dialled by the calling subscriber were the same from any telephone in the London director area, which has a linked numbering scheme. Subscribers on manual exchanges asked for a number in the format Wimbledon1234, whether the called number was on a manual or automatic exchange.

The three-letter code was written in bold capitals if the caller should dial all seven digits. If written merely in capitals it indicated that the desired number was on an exchange which had not yet been converted to automatic working, and that the caller should dial only the initial three code digits, and wait to be connected by an operator. Later some of the remaining manual exchanges were equipped with Coded-Call Indicators (CCI) which displayed the local digits dialled by the caller to the operator, The number would be listed as for an automatic subscriber with the first three letters in bold, and automatic subscribers would dial all seven digits. If an exchange was outside the Director linked-number area, the exchange name and number was in small type, e.g. Laindon 2263.

In a Director area there were 8 digits available for the A-digit letter of the exchange name (excluding "1" and "0"), and 9 digits each for the B-digit and C-digit letters; hence there were a maximum of 648 exchange names (8 × 9 × 9), though in practice some ABC codes (e.g. 555) did not have a usable name equivalent, and by 1966 London (with 350 exchanges) was running out of exchange names. Special Service numbers apart from "0" for operator used a three-letter exchange name; e.g. TOL (toll), TRU (trunk), DIR (directory enquiries), TIM (time, the "speaking clock"), ENG (engineering i.e. faults), or UMP (for the Test Match cricket scores).

== Equipment ==
To make a call, the subscriber's uniselector seizes a free first code selector, which in turn seizes an A-digit selector via an A-digit hunter uniselector. The A-digit selector returns dial tone, steps to the first dialled digit and searches for a free director from that group. The director includes a two-motion selector – the BC switch – which steps vertically and then horizontally according to the two BC digits. This selector has six banks to permit up to six pulse trains to be generated by the director to step the code selectors; the bank contacts are strapped via a translation field to indicate the digit required (or to a DCO lead to indicate that all translation digits have been sent). The pulse train output begins after the C-digit is received from the subscriber's telephone. This is generated under the control of the send switch uniselector as it searches for the marks provided by the translation field straps for the exchange code received. Meanwhile, the subscriber has continued to dial and the four digits of the numerical portion of the number are stored on four more uniselectors. These set up four more marks, and after completing the output of the code translation the send switch uniselector searches for them in turn in order to forward the numerical digits unchanged to step the numerical selectors at the terminating exchange.

Calls to manual exchanges (where the caller asks the manual exchange operator for the number) and calls to special service like "0" for operator or "999" for emergencies do not require any numeric digits.

The holding time of the A-digit selector and director will depend on the number (1 to 6) and length of code digits to be sent, and whether numeric digits are also to be sent, but averages 20 seconds. On a call to the operator via digit "0" which has already been received by the A-digit selector and requires no more than four routing digits and no numeric digits, the holding time will be only 2 or 3 seconds. As traffic to the operator via digit "0" is small, this level on the A-digit selector does not have its own group of directors; one or more of the other groups of directors is equipped with the necessary manual board facilities. Seizure of one of these directors via level "0" passes a discrimination signal to it which causes it to pulse out the routing digits to give access to the operator with no further dialling required by the subscriber.

For calls to manual local exchanges with CCI equipment to display the called number to the operator, the equipment required at the manual exchange and the director equipment holding time can be minimised by using storage equipment at the automatic exchange which holds the number information until manual exchange equipment is available.

The A-digit selector, BC switch and particularly the send switch uniselector of the director were worked much harder than selectors in the switching train which were held for the duration of the call, and the noise in the vicinity of director racks in the busy hour could be unbearable. An experimental "all-relay" director (apart from a motor uniselector for the translations) was developed in the 1950s to try to reduce the amount of maintenance the directors needed. Before they were replaced by electronic exchanges, some director exchanges had the director equipment replaced by electronic directors using CMOS technology which controlled the exchange selectors, with economies in space and maintenance.

== Code selectors ==
The first code selectors had levels for local exchange calls and calls to the local tandem exchange. An exchange with up to 23 outgoing routes would require a second code selection stage on some calls, and for more outgoing routes (up to 93) some third selection stages. But as a nearby business exchange might have 50 TU (traffic units) in the BH (busy hour), and more distant exchanges might have only 2 or 3 TUs, the busy routes should be on the first code selectors and the least busy routes only via a second and perhaps a third selection stage. Hence for a hypothetical example with 30 outgoing routes, three schemes are possible with (A) three second and no third code selector groups, (B) two second and one third code selector groups, and (C) one second and two third code selector groups. The number of switches for the hypothetical traffic distribution is 348, 302 and 315 switches, i.e. scheme B is the optimum; but each exchange must be calculated individually. The busy routes should also be allocated to the lower levels on the selectors to minimise setting-up time and also the number of operations of the mechanism and hence the wear on them.

Local call metering must be done at the originating exchange, and when local calls were charged by distance it was preferable for the first code selector levels to determine the number of unit fees required. The fee was 1 unit up to 5 miles (8 km), 2 units 5 to 7 1/2 miles (8 to 12 km), 3 units 7 1/2 to 12 1/2 miles (12 to 20 km), and 4 units 12 1/2 to 15 miles (20 to 24 km).

== Preparation for director service ==
Before director service could be introduced to any exchange in the network, all subscriber numbers were converted to the 3L-4N format, with any two- or three-digit local numbers (e.g. Tudor 432) expanded to four numeric digits. The exchange names were changed if necessary, as the same network cannot have exchanges called BRIxton and CRIcklewood, which both correspond to 274. As the first digit "0" is used for operator access, an exchange name cannot start with the letters "O" or "Q". The letter "Z" is not included on the dial, so the first three letters of an exchange name cannot include it.

In smaller director areas outside London some A-digit levels could be combined so that local director exchanges only needed three or four groups of directors instead of eight, with greater efficiency from the larger groups of directors. A hypothetical area with 30 exchanges could be served by three groups of directors serving A-digit levels 2 & 3; 4 & 7, and 5, 6 & 8. But it was not possible to have (say) exchanges called PERivale and TERminus in a director area where levels 7 and 8 were combined, and hence in these smaller areas, requirements for additional exchange names must be considered.

Before a manual exchange was converted to automatic, changes to allocated numbers to facilitate PBX hunting groups were required. In SXS automatic exchanges only some number groups have PBX hunting facility, and within those number groups the main and other numbers in a hunting group have to be in a certain order. If TUDor 2725 (say) was to be the listed (main) number subsequent numbers must be 2726, 2727, 2728 2729 and 2720; and the PBX hunting group on 2725 is limited to a maximum of six incoming lines (although the PBX could also have additional outgoing-only lines to the exchange). A PBX group with ten PBX-hunting lines would commence with 2721 (say) to 2720, and PBX hunting groups requiring more than ten incoming lines would be served by special 11-and-over PBX final selectors which could search over several (10-line) levels in succession.

In practice to save space 200-outlet final selectors were almost always used in preference to 100-outlet; the selectors switched to the alternate wipers, or not as appropriate, depending on which preceding selector stage seized them. This allowed a PBX group to have up to 20 lines without the need of 11-and-over PBX final selectors. Moreover, if these selectors were used, the PBX group could have up to 200 lines, and the final selectors in the group were arranged so that different selectors searched over the lines in a different order to reduce waiting times for callers.

Any two-party numbers also needed to be served by two-party or shared service equipment. The two subscribers on a two-party line would have separate three-letter then four digit numbers in a special number group, and had selective ringing to the party required only (code ringing with a letter suffix for the code required was not used).

== The London director area ==
In 1927 Holborn (HOLborn), the first director automatic exchange in London, was cutover at midnight on Saturday 12 November. As it was a largely business exchange, most subscribers did not use the new system until Monday 14 November. The changeover was successful, although there were some delays as the subscribers were not familiar with using a dial phone. BIShopgate and SLOane exchanges were to follow in six weeks, followed by WEStern and MONument exchanges. The London area contained 80 exchanges, and full conversion took many years.

Holborn exchange had 9,400 subscribers (lines) and had 222 directors, each of which on average handled 72 calls in the busy hour and be held for 20 seconds. Holborn was also a tandem exchange for calls to and from local manual exchanges, so that the tandem traffic from manual exchanges was combined with traffic from automatic exchanges. Handling local calls between manual exchanges via a third operator at a tandem exchange is uneconomic, but without tandem switching each manual exchange would have required direct junctions to every other manual exchange. In London there were 73 manual exchanges within 10 miles (16 km) of Oxford Circus, of which twenty had coded-call indicator equipment which displayed the number dialled to the local manual exchange operator, and the rest were to be equipped shortly.

By 1950 the London director system had 75 exchanges within a 5-mile (8 km) radius of Oxford Circus and a further 65 in the 5-to-10-mile (8 to 16 km) belt; and in Greater London i.e. within 20 miles (32 km) of Oxford Circus there were 237 exchanges altogether. London had some exchange buildings containing two separate exchanges, as the number of customer lines exceeded 10,000; e.g. CROydon and MUNicipal in Scarbrook Road.

The rotary system had been proposed for London by Bell (Western Electric) engineers, who had developed the panel and rotary systems in the 1900s; manufactured in the United States and Europe respectively. The panel system with large switches was more suitable for a densely populated area like New York, and with outer areas of London having smaller exchanges they had proposed the rotary system (initially to be manufactured in Antwerp) for London. However the director system had the advantage of using equipment items similar to the SXS exchanges being used in smaller British cities and towns, and would be manufactured in Britain from the outset. It was also possible to convert a local SXS exchange to a director exchange.

While a director area had a maximum of 648 exchange names (8 × 9 × 9), in practice some numbers do not have a usable name equivalent; unusable ABC digits would be 688 (MUTt or MUVver?) or 555. London was running out of usable names with 350 exchanges by 1965; this was one reason for the change to all-figure dialling in 1966. This problem was sidestepped to some degree by using otherwise unusable codes to give access to the fringe non-director exchanges from the director area. For example, in London callers to South Mimms were told to dial SM6 followed by the four-digit South Mimms number; callers to Uxbridge numbers were told to dial UX followed by the five-digit Uxbridge number. In this latter case the first digit of the Uxbridge number rotated the BC switch of the director and was absorbed in specifying the translation; the last digit of the translation then regenerated the first digit of the Uxbridge number.

New York telephone numbers went from 3L & 4N (1920) to 2L & 5N (1930), which increased the number of usable exchange names (see seven-digit dialling). This did not happen in the United Kingdom, but 1920s and 1930s novels by Agatha Christie sometimes quote London telephone numbers as 2L & 5N, e.g. in The Pale Horse (1961) Lady Hesketh-Dubois’s number is GRosvenor 64578 (Ch 2 p. 28), Mark has FLaxman 73841 (Ch 4 p. 47), and Ginger has CApricorn 35987 (Ch 11 p. 121). The Mystery of the Blue Train has Mayfair 81907 (p. 30). So does Ngaio Marsh; Roderick Alleyn’s phone number is SLoane 84405. This is presumably to avoid them being the same as any real London numbers.

== Other director cities ==
The director system was introduced in London (1927), and then in Manchester (1930), Birmingham (1931), Glasgow (1937), Liverpool (1941), and Edinburgh (1950). While London initially included all exchanges within 12 1/2 miles (20 km) of Oxford Circus, other cities initially included all exchanges within 7 miles (11 km) radius from the city centre, and was then extended to include larger exchanges within 9 1/2 miles (15 km) radius from the centre. Generally it was policy to install director equipment where the total number of subscribers was expected to be greater than 60,000 lines within 30 years.

In cities outside London, it was possible to avoid the installation of Coded-Call Indicator (CCI) equipment at manual exchanges by converting to automatic in stages with the issue of a new directory, e.g. converting groups of (say) six exchanges at 12-month intervals; this was done in Liverpool, Birmingham, Glasgow and Edinburgh.

In 1950 Glasgow had 35 exchanges within 7 miles (11 km) of the centre of the city, several of two units, and 11 of them were within 2 miles (3.2 km) of the centre.

By the time the director system was superseded in the UK by all-figure dialling from March 1966, London had almost exhausted all possible, usable combinations of letters (it had about 240 at that stage). While this was far from the case in the provincial cities, the crossover to all-figure dialling was still a sizeable operation in Manchester (48 exchange names to convert – including IRLam and MARple), Birmingham (43 exchanges) and Glasgow (42).

== United States ==
In the United States, most large cities were served by the Bell System and used the panel switch, or later the Number One Crossbar Switching System (1XB), or the Number 5 Crossbar Switching Systems rather than step-by-step equipment. Los Angeles being a small town early in the 20th century and partly being served by an independent telephone company, grew to be a major exception. Before the advent of electronic switching systems, directors were commonly used in areas of the city served by GTE.

== See also ==
- Sender
- List of telephone exchanges in London
- Telephony in Greater Manchester
