= Sender (telephony) =

A sender is a type of circuit and system module in 20th-century electromechanical telephone exchanges. It registered the telephone numbers dialed by the subscriber, and transmitted that information to another part of the exchange or another exchange for the purpose of completing a telephone call. Some American exchange designs, for example, of the No. 1 Crossbar switch used originating senders and terminating senders. The corresponding device in the British director telephone system was called a "director" and, in other contexts, "register".

== History ==
The sender concept was developed to meet the needs of large-city telephone switching systems, where the total number of subscriber lines and multiple central offices throughout the city required complex switching arrangements that were not easily handled by the direct control systems, such as the step by step, or Strowger system. These limitations included inefficient trunking in large service areas, and a limited ability for growth and reorganization as additional subscribers were added. The introduction of senders into switching systems allowed the subscriber's dial pulses to be registered, then translated into a physical location on the switching fabric, either in the local office, or in a distant office. Once the sender received the translation, it directed the selectors in the switching fabric to the correct terminal, completing the connection to the called party. Because the dialed digits from the subscriber were stored, and translated, there was no direct correlation required between the dialed number, and the actual location of the trunk(s) or subscribers on the switch itself. This meant that as new telephone exchanges were added, a translation could be updated to include the new exchange without expensive and time-consuming modifications to the telephone switch.

One of the first US patents filed for this concept was granted to Western Electric in 1913. This was developed in the US by the Bell System and was first widely used in the Panel Machine Switching System. As machine switching exchanges became commonplace, senders also played a critical role in communication between central offices of different types. For example, in a given city, there may be several central offices with different kinds of telephone switches that all must inter-operate with each other. As technology improved, better signaling methods were devised, but backward compatibility with existing exchanges had to be maintained. Thus, senders were developed to send and receive information in a wide variety of "protocols", including revertive pulse, MF, dial pulse, DC key pulse, and PCI.

The sender design was improved throughout the 20th Century and was used extensively in the No. 1 and No. 5 Crossbar switching systems. Common-channel signaling replaced senders after the development of stored program control (SPC).

A secondary meaning within the UK broadcast engineering community is as a synonym for broadcast transmitter.

== See also ==
- Communication source
- Director telephone system
- Register signaling
