= Panel call indicator =

Telephone signaling protocol

Panel call indicator, or PCI, is a form of signalling used between two telephone offices. It was also originally called Relay Call Indicator (RCI).

Originally designed along with the panel type telephone office, PCI was intended to allow subscribers in fully automated exchanges to dial numbers in manual offices the same way they dialed numbers in their own exchange. For PCI to achieve its purpose, the panel office sent the requested number to the manual office, where the number was lit on an operator's display. The switchboard operator at a PCI-aware manual office reads the number from the call indicator display and completes the call in the usual way. As a format of interoffice signaling, PCI is one of multiple options retained for compatibility in the #5 Crossbar switch, a later system that served as the platform for the initial DTMF push-button telephone services.

In the British Director telephone system, coded-call indicator working (CCI) filled a similar role, as it displayed dialed telephone numbers at the local manual exchange in a mixed (automatic and manual) linked-number area.

== What is sent ==
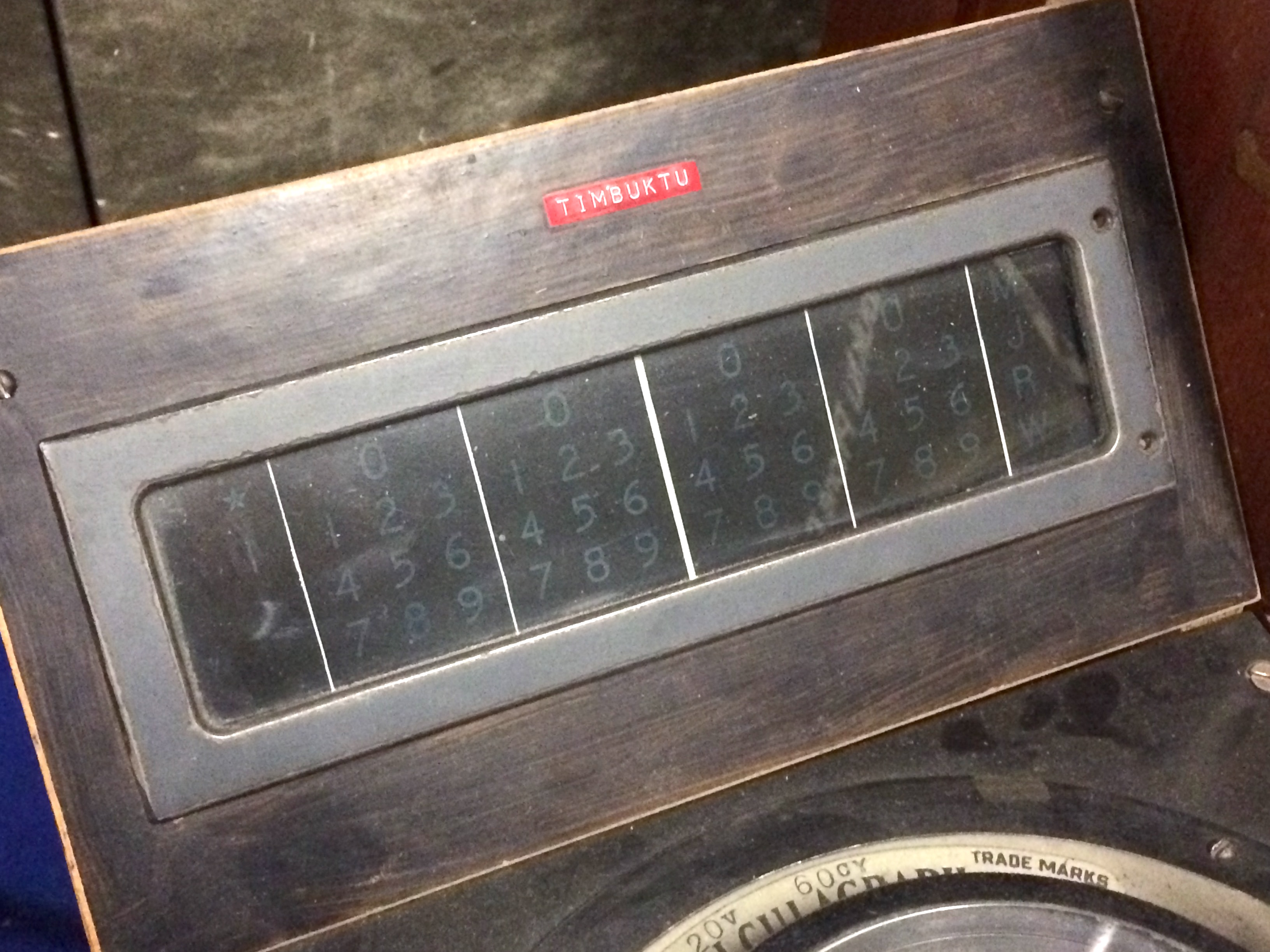
A Call Indicator on display at the Museum of Communications

The usual seven-digit US telephone number consists of a three-digit office code and a four-digit line number within the given office. After a caller in a panel office dialed the office code, the sender looked up the type of the called office (panel, manual, etc.), and whether PCI was to be used. Then the sender found a trunk to the called office. Once a trunk had been found and the decision to use PCI had been made, the sender outpulsed the digits to the manual office where they were displayed for the operator.

Because the operator only needed the last four digits of the phone number to complete the call, the first three dialed digits were not sent to the manual office. However, for two reasons, PCI always sends five-digit numbers rather than four (and the caller may need to dial eight digits rather than seven).

The panel system was designed to work with manual offices of up to 10,500 lines. Callers dialed the office code followed by the line number within the office. For lines 10,000 and up, callers therefore dialed the office code and a five-digit line number. For offices with fewer than 10,000 lines, callers dialed four digits but PCI sends a leading 0.

Also, when the panel office was designed, many people used party lines. Party line numbers were listed with a J, M, R, or W following the line number. The caller dialed the office code, the line number, and the digit corresponding to the letter. Party letters replace the ten-thousands digit described above. That is, PCI sends the letter followed by the four-digit line number. So party letters and line numbers above 10,000 can't be used together.

In special cases, calls through a tandem office also used PCI signaling. This originated with manual operator tandems, and was later carried on to machine-based tandems as well. For this special tandem class, all seven dialed digits were sent to the distant office. In the case of a manual tandem, operators had a special seven segment display which displayed the entire telephone number. In later mechanical tandems, PCI was used because it was faster than revertive pulse signaling, and would thus allow for quicker call completion times.

=== PCI encoding ===
Digits are sent in order from most to least significant. The party letter is sent first, since it replaces the ten-thousands digit.

Generally, each digit is sent as a group of four bits having the place values 1, 2, 4, and 5. This could be considered a form of biquinary code. The thousands digit is sent using binary-coded decimal, but with the 1 bit moved to the end of the group. Except for the 1 bit in the thousands digit, all bits are sent in order from least to most significant. An entire transmission uses twenty bits.

Looking at the transmission another way, it consists of twenty "time slots" which may be filled by DC pulses. The first and third pulse times in a group of four contain either a positive DC current or no current. The second and fourth pulse times in a group of four contain either a light (high resistance) negative DC pulse or a heavy (low resistance) negative DC pulse. The pattern of current flow (positive, negative, positive, negative) keeps the receiver synchronized with the sender. This pattern never varies so it contains no information. The existence of a current (in the first and third pulse times) or the resistance of the current (in the second and fourth times) carries the information.

In the below table, + represents a positive pulse, - represents a light negative pulse, and ▭ represents a heavy negative pulse. Note that the thousands digit (as transmitted) is coded differently than the hundreds, tens, and units digits.

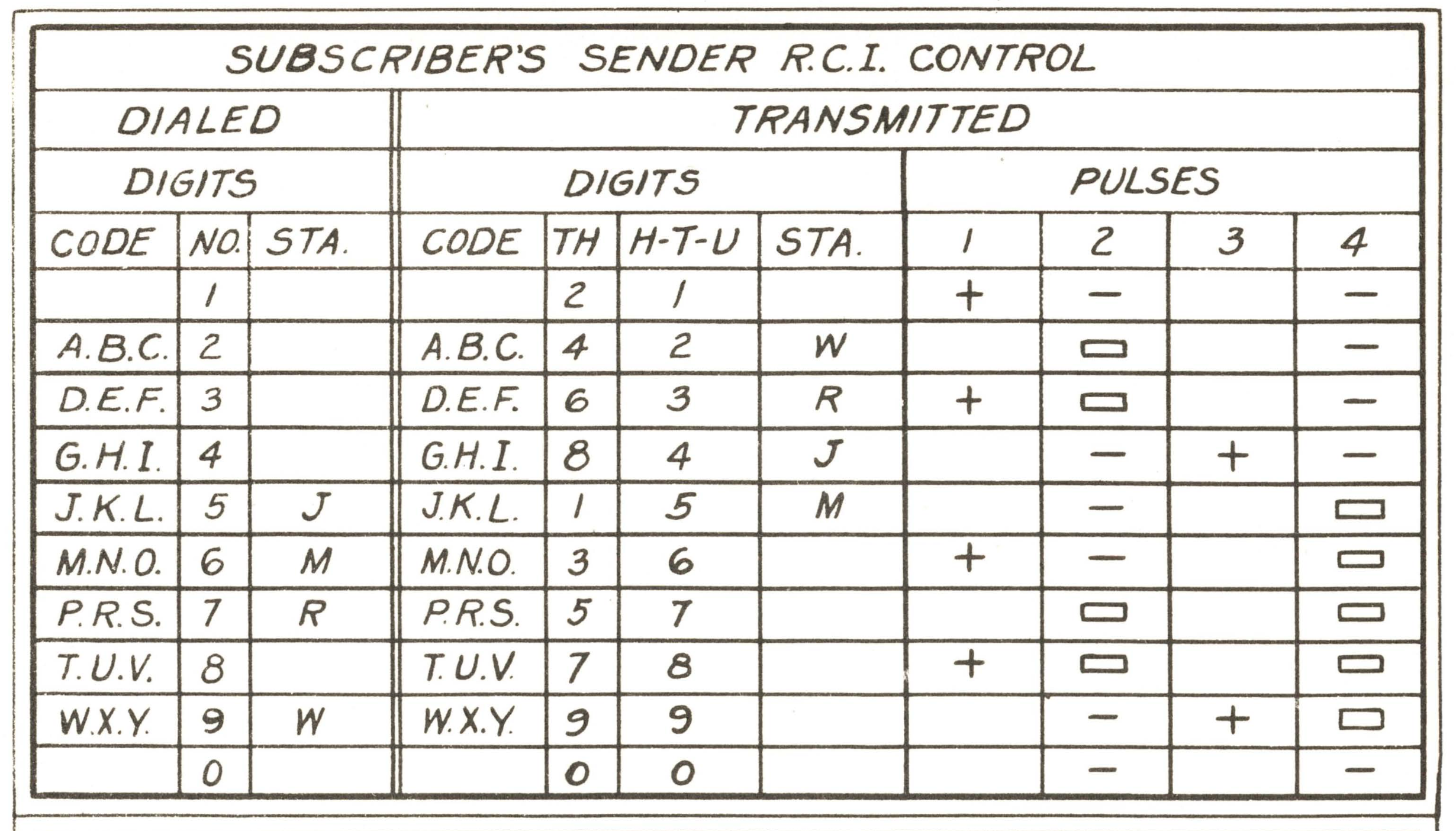

Below, is a graph of PCI pulses transmitted from the Panel switch at the Museum of Communications in Seattle. The positive and negative pulses occur on physically separate leads, but are overlaid on the same graph for simplicity, so the values of the Y axis are not absolute. Indicated on the graph are the start and end of the transmission (bottom), and the actual digits being transmitted (top).

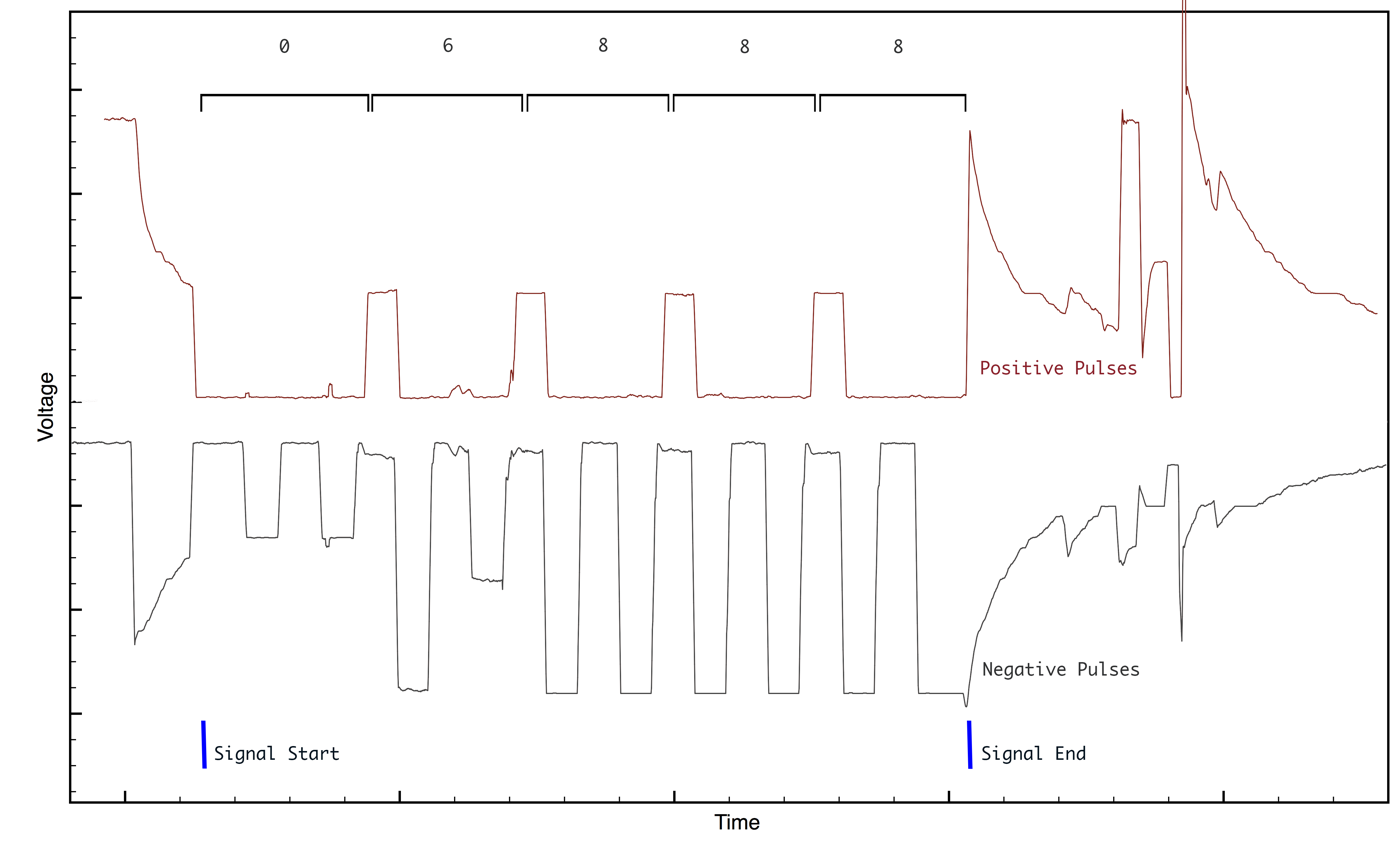
A graph of PCI pulses transmitted from the Panel switch at the Museum of Communications in Seattle. The positive and negative pulses occur on physically separate leads, but are overlaid on the same graph for simplicity, so the values of the Y axis are not absolute.

=== CCI encoding ===
The Director telephone exchange was based on a store-and-forward handling of dialled numbers, originally with seven-digit numbers. The director would receive all seven digits, use the first three to determine the destination exchange, then send the last four digits onward. For CCI working, the director would wait until the equipment at the destination was ready and then send each digit as a series of current pulses. Much like PCI signalling, each pulse had three possible levels (weak positive current, weak negative current, strong negative current) and a digit consisted of at most four pulses.
