= List of telephone exchanges in London =

This is a list of telephone exchanges located within Greater London. Occasionally, in areas of high demand, two exchanges are located at the same premises; for example Canary Wharf and Poplar.

== History ==
London had a large network of manual exchanges (80 in 1927) and individual telephone exchanges were given names, e.g. Central; a caller asked the operator for Central 1234. However, although the General Post Office (GPO) had commenced installation of automatic exchanges from 1912, the basic Strowger or SXS switch adopted as standard by the GPO was not suitable for large cities like London. So from 1927 a development of the SXS switch was installed in London, the Director system; first at HOLborn followed by BIShopgate and SLOane exchanges and then WEStern and MONument. Telephones on automatic exchanges had letters as well as numbers marked on the telephone dial, and calls to London numbers used the first three letters of the exchange name followed by four digits, e.g. EUS 1234. The number could be dialled as 387-1234 or spoken to a manual exchange operator as Euston 1234.

London manual exchanges were gradually converted to Director automatic exchanges from 1927. Holborn was the first, at midnight on Saturday 12 November, a local and tandem exchange. Bishopgate and Sloane exchanges followed in six weeks, then Western and Monument exchanges. The London area contained 80 exchanges, and full conversion was to take many years.

Until the late 1960s, some outer London exchanges did not offer direct dialling, and their numbers could be identified in the directory by being printed in light type, unlike normal exchanges, whose first three letters appeared in bold type. To call a Pinner number, for example, you would dial PIN, wait for the operator to answer, then state the 4-figure number required.

As the telephone system was modernised and liberalised with multiple telephone companies and numbers became portable, the rigid correspondence of numeric codes to exchanges was relaxed, but even today it is likely that a (7)387 number, for example, is located in the Euston area. Lists of numbers allocated to BT exchanges in the UK, including London, are available online, and enable the exchange associated with a given number to be found, if applicable. Locations of exchanges, given a postcode in their catchment area, are also documented.

== List of exchanges ==
NOTE: The United Kingdom adopts an open dialling plan for area codes within its public switched telephone network. Therefore, all area codes have a preceding 0 (zero) when dialling from within the United Kingdom. When dialling a UK number from abroad the zero is omitted and replaced by the calling country's international call prefix followed by 44, the country code for the UK. Thus a call to the Euston exchange discussed above from the United States would be to 011 (US international prefix) 44 20 (London) 73871234.

OLO (Note: An "Other Licensed Operator" (OLO) is a landline provider that is not British Telecom.) code	Exchange name	London borough	Dial code
LWACT	Acton	Ealing	020
LSADD	Addiscombe	Croydon	020
LNADK	Albert Dock	Newham	020
WRBAL	Balham	Wandsworth	020
LNBKG	Barking	Barking and Dagenham	020
LNBAR	Barnet	Barnet	020
LSBATT	Battersea	Wandsworth	020
WEWBAY	Bayswater	Westminster	020
LSBEC	Beckenham	Bromley	020
WRBEL	Belgravia	Westminster	020
CLBER	Bermondsey	Southwark	020
LSBEU	Beulah Hill	Croydon	020
LSBEX	Bexleyheath	Bexley	020
NDBHI	Biggin Hill	Bromley	01959
CLBIS	Bishopsgate	City of London	020
WEWBLO	Bloomsbury	Camden	020
LNBPK	Bowes Park	Haringey	020
WRBRIX	Brixton	Lambeth	020
LSBRO	Bromley	Bromley	020
LNCNW	Canary Wharf	Tower Hamlets	020
CLCAN	Canonbury	Islington	020
LSCTFD	Catford	Lewisham	020
WRCHEL	Chelsea	Kensington and Chelsea	020
LSCHES	Chessington	Kingston upon Thames	020
LNCHF	Chingford	Waltham Forest	020
LSCHI	Chislehurst	Bromley	020
LWCHI	Chiswick	Hounslow	020
LNCLA	Clapton	Hackney	020
CLCLE	Clerkenwell	Islington	020
LWCOL	Colindale	Barnet	020
CLCOV	Covent Garden	Westminster	020
LSCRAY	Crayford	Bexley	01322
LWCRI	Cricklewood	Barnet	020
LNCED	Crouch End	Haringey	020
LSCRO	Croydon	Croydon	020
LNDAG	Dagenham	Barking and Dagenham	020
LWDEN	Denham	Denham	01895
LSDEP	Deptford	Lewisham	020
LSDOW	Downland	Croydon	01737
LSDUL	Dulwich	Southwark	020
LWEAL	Ealing	Ealing	020
WRECT	Earls Court	Kensington and Chelsea	020
LWEDG	Edgware	Barnet	020
LNEDM	Edmonton	Enfield	020
LSELT	Eltham	Greenwich	020
LNENF	Enfield	Enfield	020
LSERI	Erith	Bexley	01322
CLEUS	Euston	Camden	020
CLFAR	Faraday	City of London	020
LSFARB	Farnborough	Bromley	01689
LWFEL	Feltham	Hounslow	020
LNFIN	Finchley	Barnet	020
CLFLE	Fleet	City of London	020
LSFOR	Forest Hill	Lewisham	020
WRFULM	Fulham	Hammersmith and Fulham	020
LNGHL	Gants Hill	Redbridge	020
LSGIP	Gipsy Hill	Lambeth	020
LWGOL	Golders Green	Barnet	020
LNGDM	Goodmayes	Redbridge	020
LWGRE	Greenford	Ealing	020
LSGRNW	Greenwich	Greenwich	020
LSGRO	Grove Park	Lewisham	020
LNHAC	Hackney	Hackney	020
LWHAM	Hammersmith	Hammersmith and Fulham	020
WEWHAM	Hampstead	Camden	020
LWHARE	Harefield	Hillingdon	01895
LWHARL	Harlesden	Brent	020
LWHARR	Harrow	Harrow	020
LWHAT	Hatch End	Harrow	020
LSHAY	Hayes Common	Bromley	020
LWHAY	Hayes North	Hillingdon	020
LWHEN	Hendon	Barnet	020
LNHPK	Highams Park	Waltham Forest	020
CLHOL	Holborn	Camden	020
LNHOR	Hornchurch	Havering	01708
LWHOU	Hounslow	Hounslow	020
LNILC	Ilford Central	Redbridge	020
LNILN	Ilford North	Redbridge	020
LNING	Ingrebourne	Havering	01708
LWISL	Isleworth	Hounslow	020
LWKGRE	Kensal Green	Westminster	020
WRKGDN	Kensington Gardens	Kensington and Chelsea	020
CLKEN	Kentish Town	Camden	020
LWKROA	Kenton Road	Harrow	020
LSKID	Kidbrooke	Greenwich	020
CLKXX	Kings Cross	Camden	020
LWKIN	Kingsbury	Brent	020
CLKLG	Kingsland Green	Islington	020
LSKIN	Kingston	Kingston upon Thames	020
LWKNE	Kneller Hall	Richmond upon Thames	020
LSLEE	Lee Green	Lewisham	020
LNLEY	Leytonstone	Waltham Forest	020
LSLODH	Lodge Hill	Croydon	01689
WEWLOR	Lords	Westminster	020
CLLOW	Lower Holloway	Islington	020
WEWMAI	Maida Vale	Camden	020
LSMAL	Malden	Kingston upon Thames	020
WEWMAR	Marylebone	Westminster	020
WEWMAY	Mayfair	Westminster	020
LSMEPK	Merton Park	Merton	020
LNMED	Mile End	Tower Hamlets	020
LWMIL	Mill Hill	Barnet	020
LSMIT	Mitcham	Merton	020
LSMOL	Molesey	Richmond upon Thames	020
CLMON	Monument	City of London	020
CLMOO	Moorgate	City of London	020
LSMOR	Mortlake	Richmond upon Thames	020
LNMUS	Muswell Hill	Haringey	020
CLNEW	New Cross	Lewisham	020
LNNWS	New Southgate	Barnet	020
WRNELMS	Nine Elms	Wandsworth	020
LSNOR	Norbury	Croydon	020
LSNCHM	North Cheam	Sutton	020
LWNEDG	North Edgware	Barnet	020
LNNFN	North Finchley	Barnet	020
WEWNPN	North Paddington	Westminster	020
LWNWEM	North Wembley	Brent	020
LWNOR	Northolt	Ealing	020
LWNWOO	Northwood	Hillingdon	01923
LSORP	Orpington	Bromley	01689
WEWPAD	Paddington	Westminster	020
LNPGN	Palmers Green	Enfield	020
WRPGRN	Parsons Green	Hammersmith and Fulham	020
LWPER	Perivale	Ealing	020
WRPIM	Pimlico	Westminster	020
LWPIN	Pinner	Harrow	020
LNPON	Ponders End	Enfield	020
LNPOP	Poplar	Tower Hamlets	020
WEWPRI	Primrose Hill	Westminster	020
LSPUR	Purley	Croydon	020
LSPUT	Putney	Wandsworth	020
LNRAI	Rainham	Havering	01708
LSRIC	Richmond Kew	Richmond upon Thames	020
LNROM	Romford	Havering	01708
LWRUI	Ruislip	Hillingdon	01895
LSRUS	Rushey Green	Lewisham	020
LSSAN	Sanderstead	Croydon	020
LWSHE	Shepherd's Bush	Hammersmith and Fulham	020
CLSHO	Shoreditch	Hackney	020
LSSID	Sidcup	Bexley	020
LWSKY	Skyport	Hillingdon	020
LSSLA	Slade Green	Bexley	01322
WRSLO	Sloane	Kensington and Chelsea	020
WEWSOH	Soho (Gerrard Street)	Westminster	020
LSCLPM	South Clapham	Wandsworth	020
LWSHAR	South Harrow	Harrow	020
WRSKEN	South Kensington	Kensington and Chelsea	020
LWSOU	Southall	Ealing	020
WRSTHBK	Southbank	Southwark	020
CLSOU	Southwark	Southwark	020
LNSTA	Stamford Hill	Hackney	020
LWSTAN	Stanmore	Harrow	020
CLSTE	Stepney Green	Tower Hamlets	020
LNSTF	Stratford	Newham	020
LSSTR	Streatham	Lambeth	020
LSSUR	Surbiton	Kingston upon Thames	020
LSSUT	Sutton Cheam	Sutton	020
LSSYD	Sydenham	Bromley	020
LSTED	Teddington	Richmond upon Thames	020
LSTHMD	Thamesmead	Greenwich	020
LSTHO	Thornton Heath	Croydon	020
LNTOT	Tottenham	Haringey	020
LSTUL	Tulse Hill	Lambeth	020
LWTWI	Twickenham	Richmond upon Thames	020
LNUPM	Upminster	Havering	01708
CLUPP	Upper Holloway	Islington	020
LNUPK	Upton Park	Newham	020
LWUXB	Uxbridge	Hillingdon	01895
WRVAUX	Vauxhall	Lambeth	020
LSWAL	Wallington	Sutton	020
LNWTH	Walthamstow	Waltham Forest	020
CLWAL	Walworth	Southwark	020
LSWAN	Wandsworth	Wandsworth	020
LNWSD	Wanstead	Redbridge	020
CLWAP	Wapping	Tower Hamlets	020
LWWEM	Wembley	Brent	020
LWWDRA	West Drayton	Hillingdon	01895
WRWKEN	West Kensington	Hammersmith and Fulham	020
LSWWKM	West Wickham	Bromley	020
WRWMIN	Westminster	Westminster	020
WRWHI	Whitehall	Westminster	020
LWWIL	Willesden	Brent	020
LSWIM	Wimbledon	Merton	020
LNWIN	Winchmore Hill	Enfield	020
CLWOO	Wood Street	City of London	020
LNWFD	Woodford	Redbridge	020
LSWOO	Woolwich	Greenwich	020
LSWOR	Worcester Park	Sutton	020

The following exchanges are located outside Greater London, but use the London 020 dial code.

OLO code	Exchange name	District, County	Dial code
LWBUS	Bushey Heath	Hertsmere, Hertfordshire	020
LWELS	Elstree	Hertsmere, Hertfordshire	020
LNHAI	Hainault	Epping Forest, Essex	020
LSEWE	Ewell	Epsom and Ewell, Surrey	020
LNLOU	Loughton	Epping Forest, Essex	020
LSTHDT	Thames Ditton	Elmbridge, Surrey	020

== See also ==
- Telephone numbers in the United Kingdom
