= Pulse dialing =

Telephone address signaling protocol

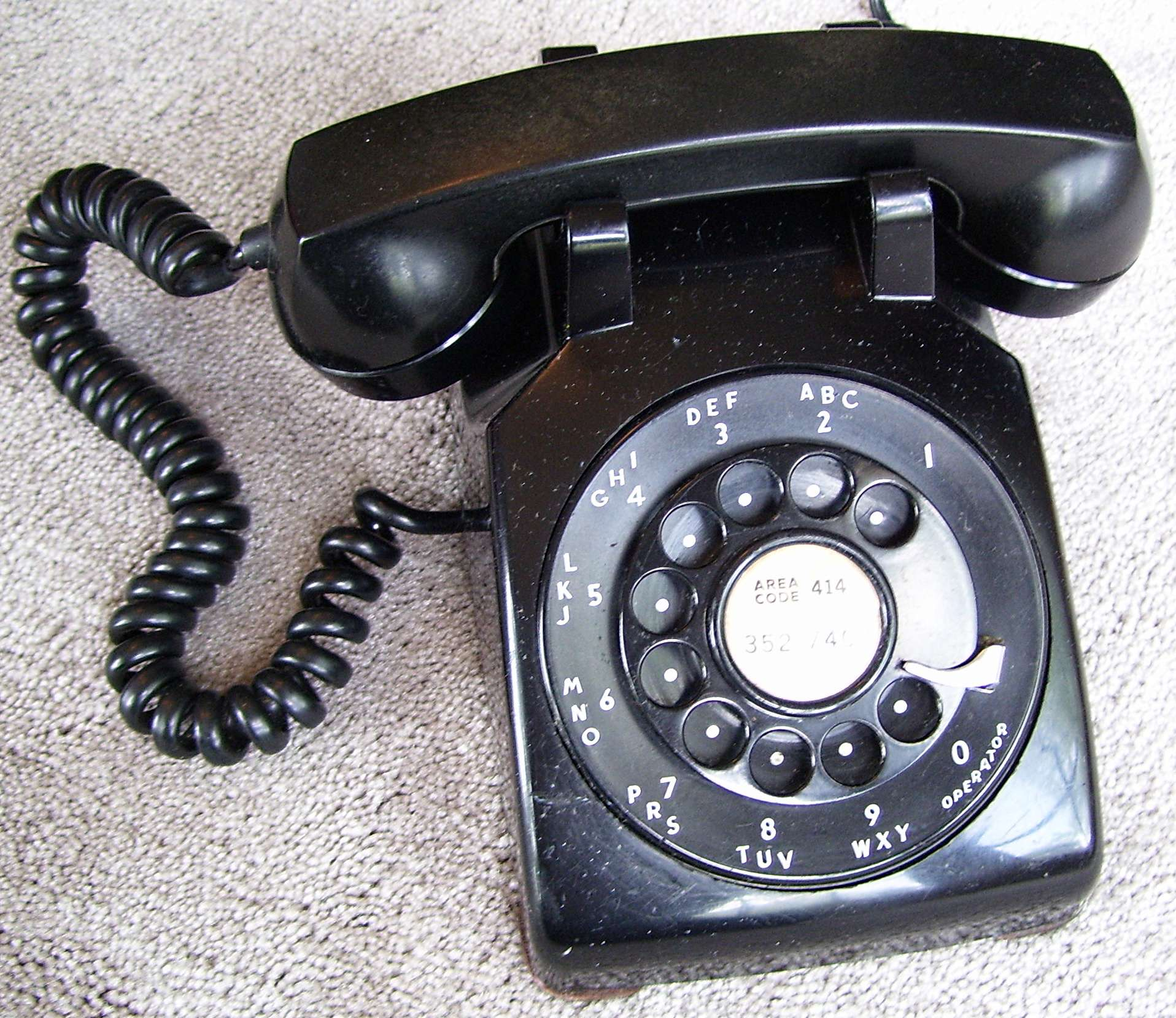
The model 500 rotary dial telephone by Western Electric was a pulse-dialing instrument.

Pulse dialing is a signaling technology in telecommunications in which the direct current flowing in the telephone local loop circuit is interrupted in a pattern according to a coding system for each signal (digit) transmitted. This lends the technology the name loop disconnect signaling. In the most common variant of pulse dialing, decadic dialing, each of the ten Arabic numerals is encoded in a sequence of up to ten current pulses. The most common version decodes the digits 1 through 9 as one to nine pulses, respectively, and the digit 0 as ten pulses. Historically, the most common device to produce such pulse trains is the rotary dial of the telephone, lending the technology another name: rotary dialing.

The pulse repetition rate was historically determined based on the response time needed for electromechanical switching systems to operate reliably. Most telephone systems used the nominal rate of ten pulses per second, but operator dialing within and between central offices often used pulse rates up to twenty per second.

== Early automatic exchanges ==
Automatic telephone exchange systems were developed in the late 19th and early 20th century. Telephone subscribers were assigned a telephone number unique to each circuit or telephone. Various methods evolved to signal the desired destination telephone number for each telephone call directly dialed by the subscriber. An automatic switch-hook was designed by Hilborne Roosevelt.

The first commercial automatic telephone exchange, designed by Almon Brown Strowger, opened in La Porte, Indiana on 3 November 1892 and used two telegraph-type keys on the telephone, which had to be operated the correct number of times to control the vertical and horizontal relay magnets in the exchange. But the use of separate keys with separate conductors to the exchange was not practical. The most common signaling system became a system of using direct-current pulse trains generated in the telephone sets of subscribers by interrupting the single-pair wire loop of the telephone circuit.

== Rotary dial ==
The first rotary dials worked by creating current interruptions on two separate direct-current circuits (three-wire system) to actuate stepping motors in a vertical and horizontal (rotational) switch arrangement. Operating the dial without error required smooth rotary motion of the finger wheel by the user, and was found to be too unreliable. Later dials after c. 1907 produced just a single pulse train on a 2-wire circuit as the user rotated the dial to the finger stop, starting at a different position for each digit transmitted. This mechanism was refined to include a recoil spring and a centrifugal governor to control the recoil speed. The user selected a digit to be dialed by inserting a finger into the corresponding hole and rotated the dial to the finger stop. When released from this position, the dial pulsing contacts were opened and closed repeatedly, thus interrupting the loop current in a pattern on the return to the home position. The exchange switch decoded the pattern for each digit, using stepping relays or by accumulation in digit registers.

== Pulse rate and coding ==
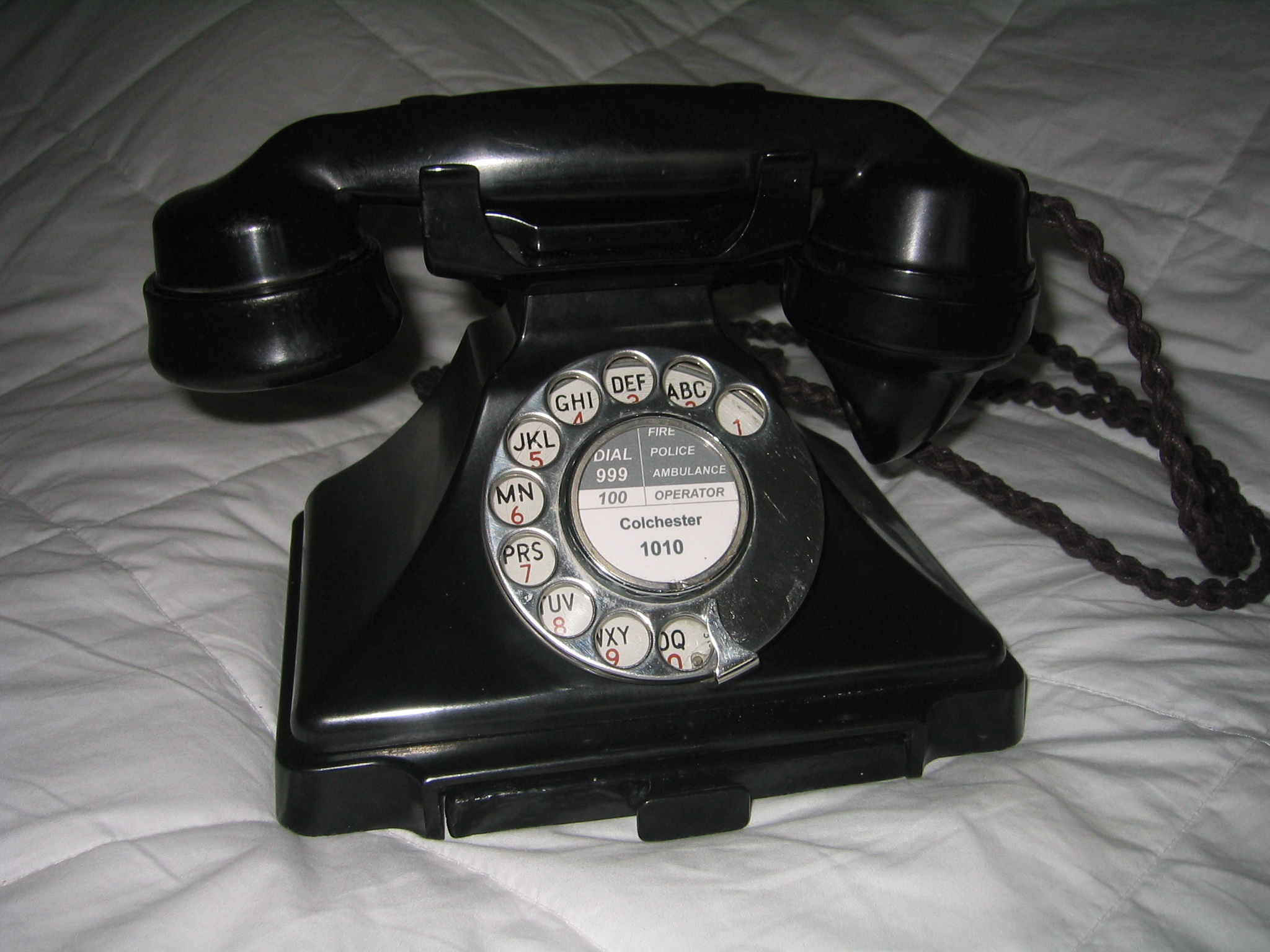
British (GPO) Type 232 telephone of 1932

The mechanical nature of the stepping switches or relays employed at the switching system generally limited the speed of operation – the pulsing rate – to ten pulses per second.

The specifications of the Bell System in the US required service personnel to adjust dials in customer stations to a precision of 9.5 to 10.5 pulses per second (PPS), but the tolerance of the switching equipment was generally between 8 and 11 PPS. The British (GPO, later Post Office Telecommunications) standard for Strowger switch exchanges has been 10 impulses per second (allowable range 7 to 12) and a 66% break ratio (allowable range 63% to 72%).

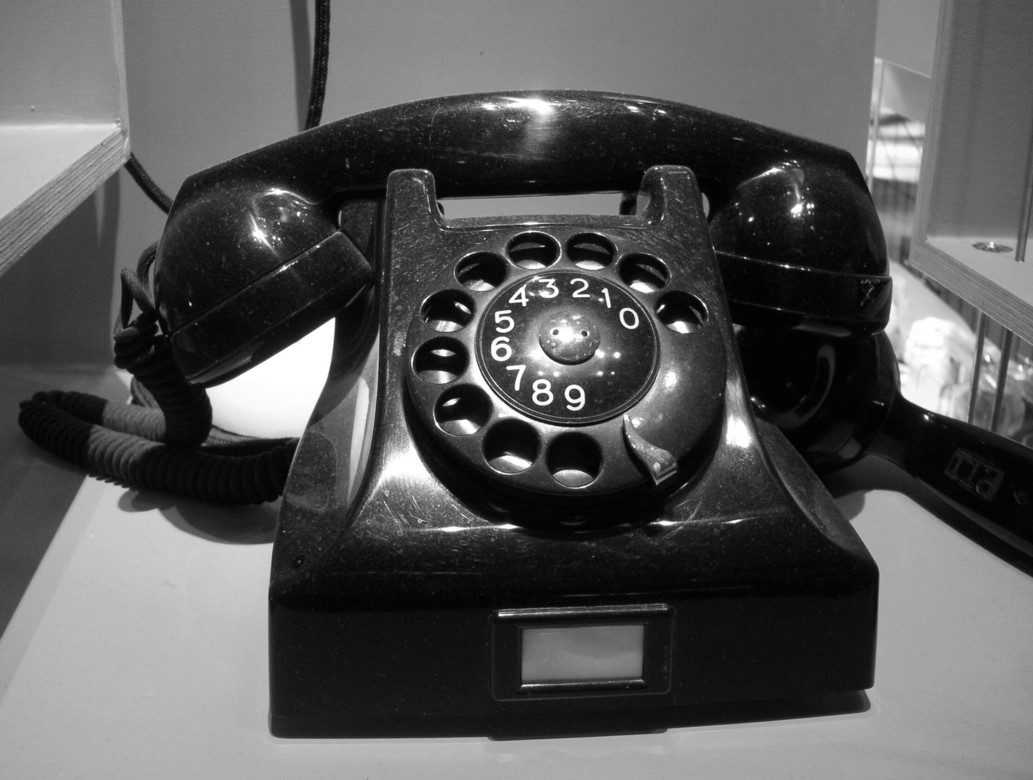
Swedish phone with one pulse for 0

In most switching systems, one pulse is used for the digit 1, two pulses for 2, and so on, with ten pulses for the digit 0; this makes the code unary, excepting the digit 0. Exceptions to this are Sweden, with one pulse for 0, two pulses for 1, and so on, and New Zealand, with ten pulses for 0, nine pulses for 1, etc. Oslo, the capital city of Norway, used the New Zealand system, but the rest of the country did not. Systems that used this encoding of the ten digits in a sequence of up to ten pulses are known as decadic dialing systems.

Some switching systems used digit registers that doubled the allowable pulse rate up to twenty pulses per second, and the inter-digital pause could be reduced, as the switch selection did not have to be completed during the pause. These included access lines to the panel switch in the 1920s, crossbar systems, the later version (7A2) of the rotary system, and the earlier 1970s stored program control exchanges.

In some telephones, the pulses may be heard in the receiver as clicking sounds. However, in general, such effects were undesirable, and telephone designers suppressed them with off-normal switches on the dial to exclude the receiver from the circuit or greatly attenuated them by electrical means with a varistor connected across the receiver.

== Successors ==
It was recognized as early as the 1910s that push buttons were faster than rotary dials, when the first panel switches used keys for dialing at the operator stations. In the 1940s, Bell Laboratories conducted field trials of pushbutton telephones for customer dialing to determine accuracy and efficiency. However, the technology of using mechanical reed relays was too unreliable until transistors transformed the industry. In 1963, the Bell System introduced to the public dual-tone multi-frequency (DTMF) technology under the name Touch-Tone, which was a trademark in the U.S. until 1984. The Touch-Tone system used push-button telephones. In the decades after 1963, rotary dials were gradually phased out on new telephone models in favor of keypads, and the primary dialing method to the central office became touchtone dialing. Most central office systems still support rotary telephones today. Some keypad telephones have a switch or configuration method for the selection of tone or pulse dialing.

Mobile telephones and most voice-over-IP systems use out-of-band signaling and do not send any digits until the entire number has been keyed by the user. Many VoIP systems are based on the Session Initiation Protocol (SIP), which uses a form of Uniform Resource Identifiers (URI) for addressing, instead of digits alone.

== Switch-hook dialing ==
As pulse dialing is achieved by interruption of the local loop, it was possible to dial digits by rapidly tapping, i.e., depressing, the switch hook the corresponding number of times at approximately ten taps per second. However, many telephone makers implemented a slow switch hook release to prevent rapid switching.

In the United Kingdom, it was once possible to make calls from coin-box phones by tapping the switch hook without depositing coins. Unlawfully obtaining a free telephone call was deemed a criminal offence, abstracting electricity from the General Post Office, which operated the telephone system, and several cases were prosecuted.

In popular culture, tapping is shown in the film Red Dragon, when prisoner Hannibal Lecter dials out on a telephone without a dialing mechanism. The technique is also used by the character Phantom Phreak in the film Hackers.
