= Protocol-control information =

In telecommunications, the term protocol-control information (PCI) has the following meanings:

1. The queries and replies among communications equipment to determine the respective capabilities of each end of the communications link.
2. For layered systems, information exchanged between entities of a given layer, via the service provided by the next lower layer, to coordinate their joint operation.
