= Panel switch =

Type of automatic telephone exchange

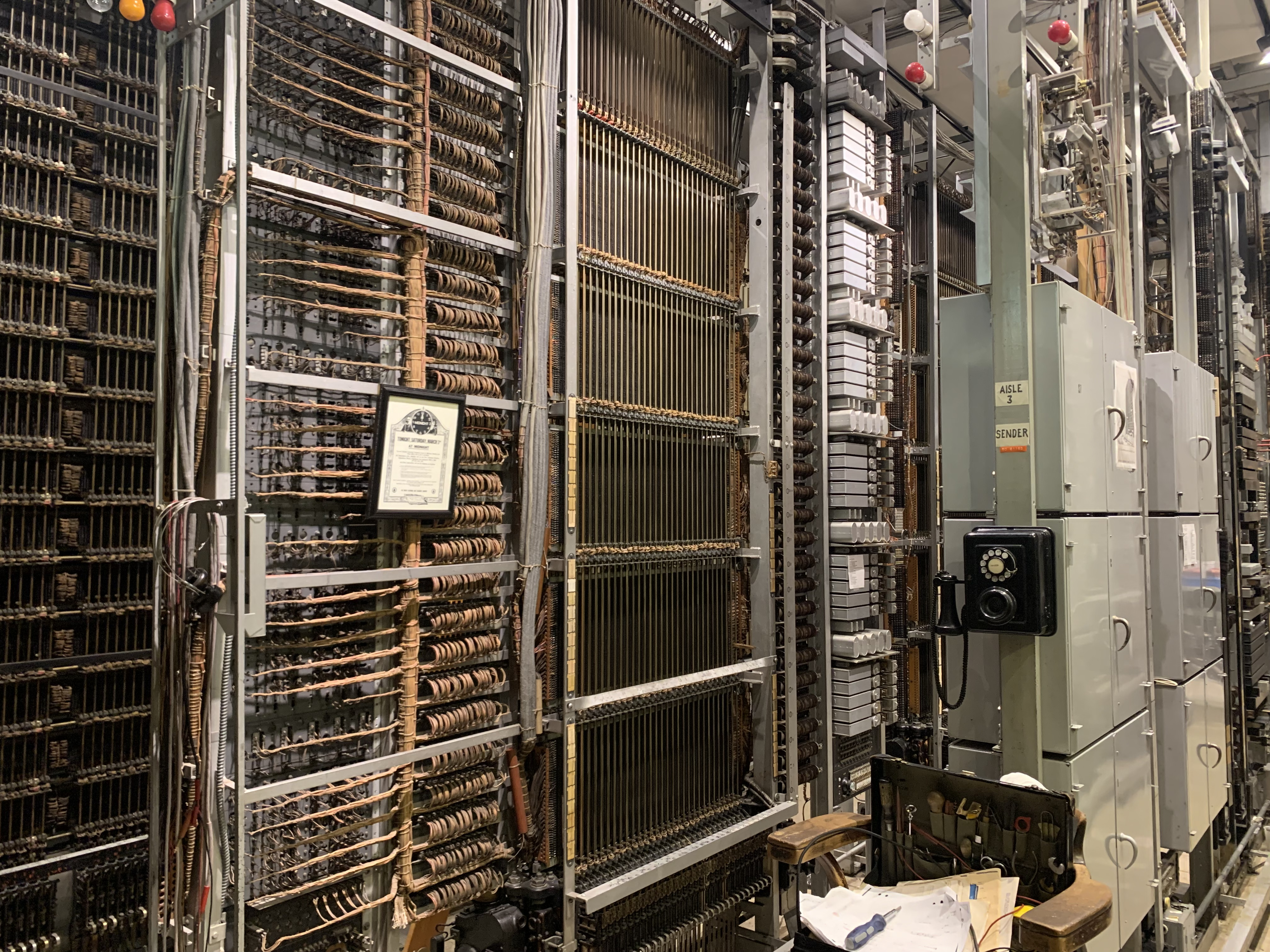
Panel switch district selector frame at the Connections Museum in Seattle

The Panel Machine Switching System is a type of automatic telephone exchange for urban service that was used in the Bell System in the United States for seven decades. The first semi-mechanical types of this design were installed in 1915 in Newark, New Jersey, and the last were retired in the same city in 1983.

The Panel switch was named for its tall panels which consisted of layered strips of terminals. Between each strip was placed an insulating layer, which kept each metal strip electrically isolated from the ones above and below. These terminals were arranged in banks, five of which occupied an average selector frame. Each bank contained 100 sets of terminals, for a total of 500 sets of terminals per frame. At the bottom, the frame had two electric motors to drive sixty selectors up and down by electromagnetically controlled clutches. As calls were completed through the system, selectors moved vertically over the sets of terminals until they reached the desired location, at which point the selector stopped its upward travel, and selections progressed to the next frame, until finally, the called subscriber's line was reached.

== History ==
In c. 1906, AT&T organized two research groups for solving the unique challenges in switching telephone traffic in the large urban centers in the Bell System. Large cities had a complex infrastructure of manual switching that prevented complete ad hoc conversion to mechanical switching, but more favorable economics was anticipated from conversion to mechanical operation. No satisfactory methods existed for interconnecting manual systems with machines for switching. The two groups at the Western Electric Laboratories focused on different technologies, using competitive development to stimulate invention and increase product quality, a concept that had been successful at AT&T previously in transmitter design. One group continued existing work that yielded the Rotary system, while the second group developed a system that was based on linear movement of switch components, which became known as the panel bank. As work continued, many subassemblies were shared, and the two switches only distinguished themselves in the switching mechanisms.

By 1910, the design of the Rotary system had progressed farther and internal trials employed it at Western Electric as a private branch exchange (PBX). However, by 1912, the company had decided that the panel system showed better promise to solve the large-city problem, and delegated the use of the Rotary system for use in Europe to satisfy the growing demand and competition from other vendors there, under the management and manufacture by the International Western Electric Company in Belgium.

After a trial installation as a PBX within Western Electric in 1913, Panel system planning commenced with design and construction of field trial central offices using a semi-mechanical method of switching, in which subscribers still used telephones without a dial, and operators answered calls and keyed the destination telephone number into the panel switch, which then completed the call automatically.

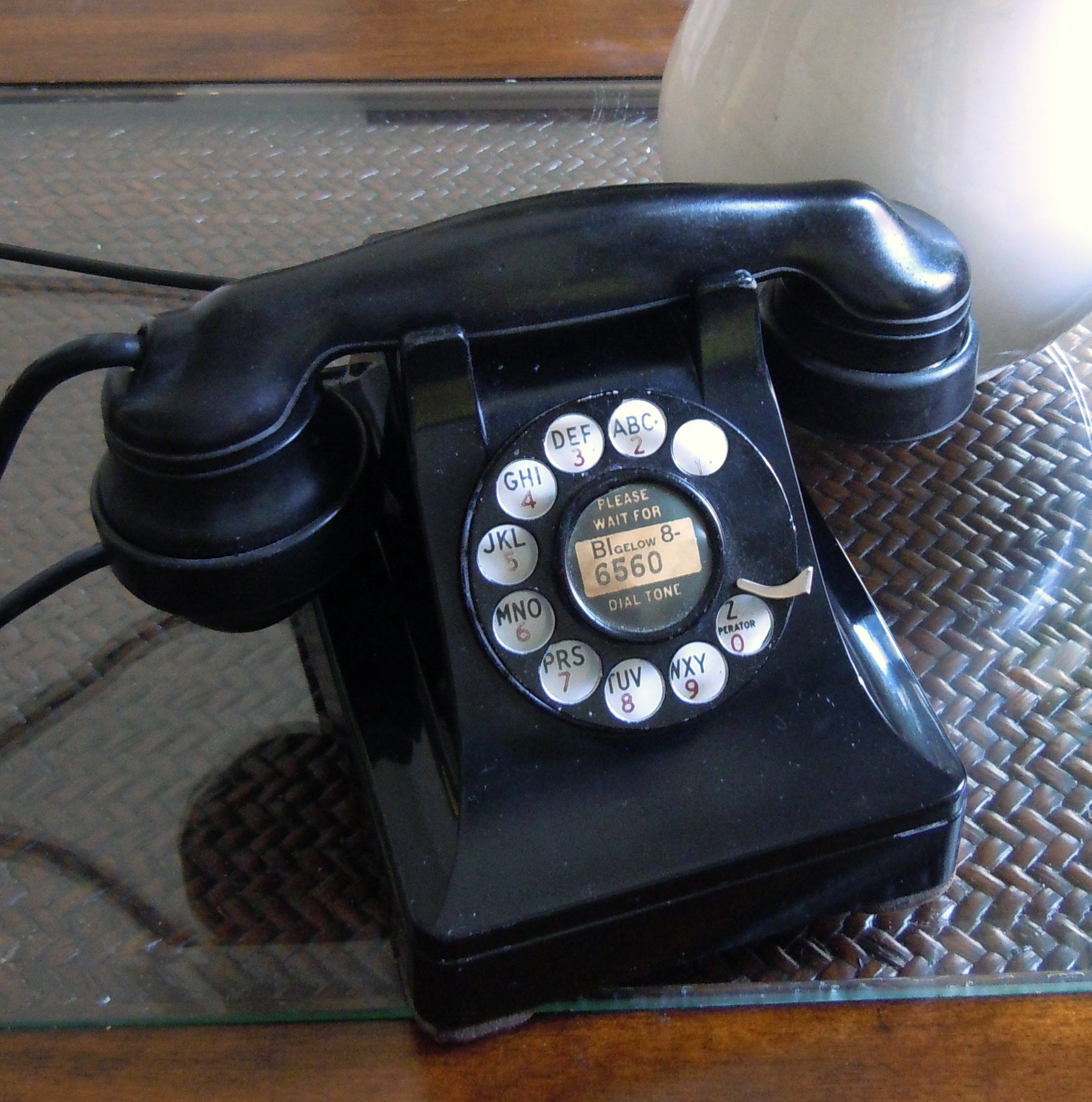
1948 Western Electric Model 302 telephone set that was installed near Newark airport, and connected to a line of the Newark exchange "BIgelow", the last existing Panel office when it was dismantled in 1983.

These first panel-type exchanges were placed in service in Newark, New Jersey, on January 16, 1915 at the Mulberry central office serving 3640 subscribers, and on June 12 in the Waverly central office, which had 6480 lines. Panel development continued throughout the rest of the 1910s and in the 1920s in the United States. A third system in Newark (Branch Brook) followed in April 1917 for testing automatic call distribution.

The first fully machine-switching Panel systems using common control principles were the Douglas and Tyler exchanges in Omaha, Nebraska, completed in December 1921. Subscribers were issued new telephones with dials, that permitted the subscriber to place local calls without operator assistance. This installation was followed by the first installations in the eastern region in the Sherwood and Syracuse-2 central offices in Paterson, New Jersey, in May and July 1922, respectively. The storied Pennsylvania exchange in New York City was cut-over to service in October 1922.

Most Panel installations were replaced by modern systems during the 1970s. The last Panel switch, located in the Bigelow central office in Newark, was decommissioned by 1983.

== Operational overview ==
When a subscriber removes the receiver (earpiece) from the hookswitch of a telephone, the local loop circuit to the central office is closed. This causes the flow of current through the loop and a line relay, which causes the relay to operate, starting a selector in the line finder frame to hunt for the terminal of the subscriber's line. Simultaneously, a sender is selected, which provides dial tone to the caller once the line is found. The line finder then operates a cutoff relay, which prevents that telephone from being called, should another subscriber happen to dial the number.

Dial tone confirms to the subscriber that the system is ready for dialing. Depending on the local numbering system, the sender required either six or seven digits in order to complete the call. As the subscriber dialed, relays in the sender counted and stored the digits for later usage. As soon as the two, or three digits of the office code were dialed and stored, the sender performed a lookup against a translator (early-type) or decoder (later-type). The translator or decoder took the two or three digits as input, and returned data to the sender that contained the parameters for connecting to the called central office. After the sender received the data provided by the translator or decoder, the sender used this information to guide the district selector and office selector to the location of the terminals that would connect the caller to the central office where the terminating line was located. The sender also stored and utilized other information pertaining to the electrical requirements for signaling over the newly established connection, and the rate at which the subscriber should be billed, should the call successfully complete.

On the district or office selectors themselves, idle outgoing trunks were picked by the "sleeve test" method. After being directed by the sender to the correct group of terminals corresponding to the outgoing trunks to the called office, the selector continued moving upward through a number of terminals, checking for one with an un-grounded sleeve lead, then selecting and grounding it. If all the trunks were busy, the selector hunted to the end of the group, and finally sent back an "all circuits busy" tone. There was no provision for alternate routing as in earlier manual systems and later more sophisticated mechanical ones.

Once the connection to the terminating office was established, the sender used the last four (or five) digits of the telephone number to reach the called party. It did so by converting the digits into specific locations on the remaining incoming and final frames. After the connection was established all the way to the final frame, the called party's line was tested for busy. If the line was not busy, the incoming selector circuit sent ringing voltage forward to the called party's line and waited for the called party to answer their telephone. If the called party answered, supervision signals were sent backwards through the sender, and to the district frame, which established a talking path between both subscribers, and charged the calling party for the call. At this time, the sender was released, and could be used again in service of an entirely new call. If the called subscriber's line was busy, the final selector sent a busy signal back to the called party to alert them that the caller was on the phone and could not accept their call.

== Telephone numbering ==
As in the Strowger system, each central office could address up to 10,000 numbered lines (0000 to 9999), requiring four digits for each subscriber station.

The panel system was designed to connect calls in a local metropolitan calling area. Each office was assigned a two- or three-digit office code, called an office code, which indicated to the system the central office in which the desired party was located. Callers dialed the office code followed by the station number. In larger cities, such as New York City, dialing required a three-digit office code, and in less-populated cities, such as Seattle, WA and Omaha, NE, a two-digit code. The remaining digits of the telephone number corresponded to the station number, which pointed to the physical location of the subscriber's telephone on the final frame of the called office. For instance, a telephone number may be listed as PA2-5678, where PA2 (722) is the office code and 5678 is the station number.

In areas that served party lines, the system accepted an additional digit for party identification. This allowed the sender to direct the final selector not only to the correct terminal, but to ring the correct subscriber's line on that terminal. The panel system supported individual, 2-party, and 4-party lines.

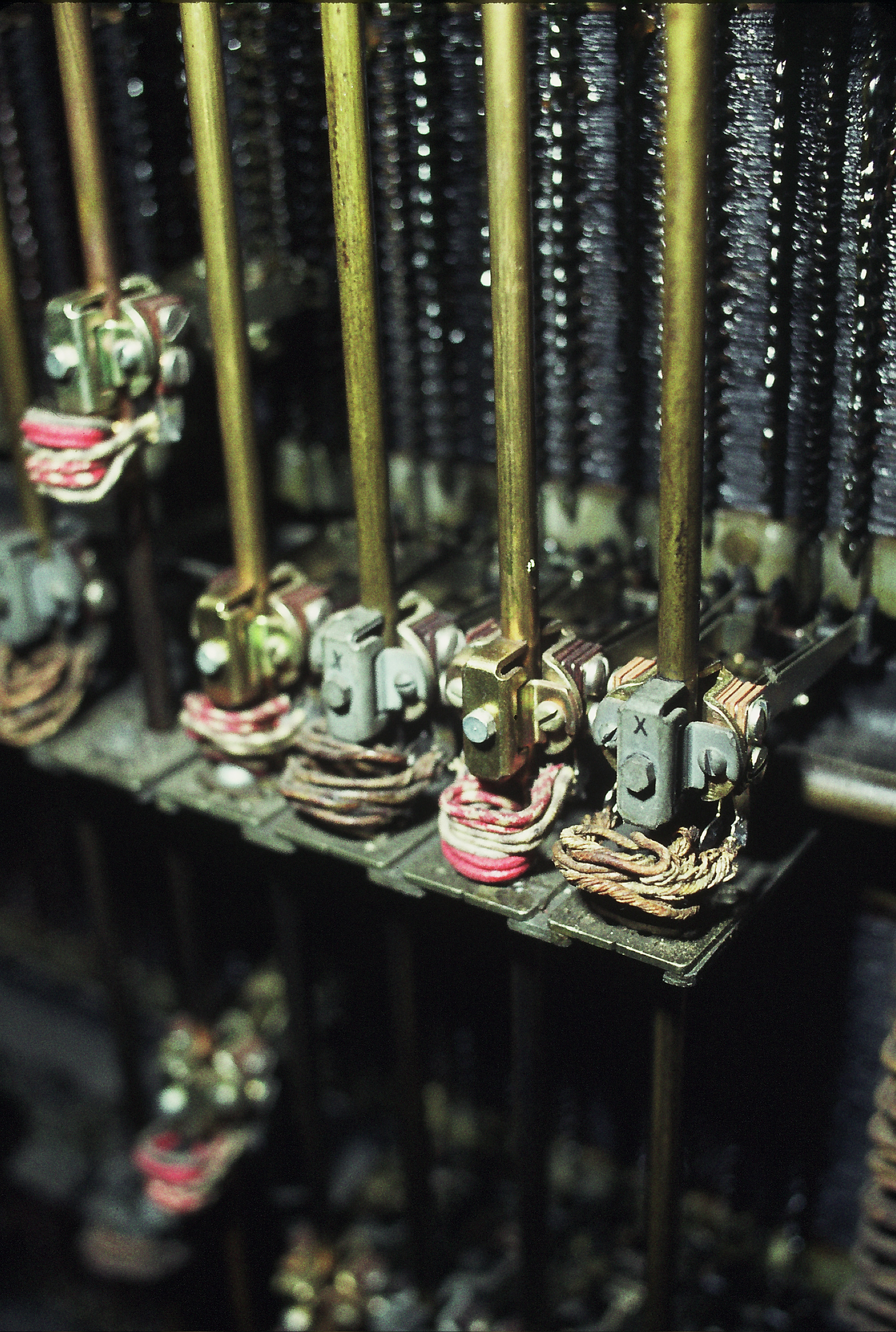
Panel ground-cut-off (GCO) line finder brushes

== Circuit features ==
Similar to the divided-multiple telephone switchboard, the panel system was divided into an originating section and a terminating section. The subscriber's line had two appearances in a local office: one on the originating side, and one on the terminating side. The line circuit consisted of a line relay on the originating side to indicate that a customer had gone off-hook, and a cutoff relay to keep the line relay from interfering with an established connection. The cutoff relay was controlled by a sleeve lead that, as with the multiple switchboard, could be activated by either the originating section or the terminating. On the terminating end, the line circuit was connected to a final selector, which was used in call completion. Thus, when a call was completed to a subscriber, the final selector circuit connected to the desired line, and then performed a sleeve (busy) test. If the line was not busy, the final selector operated the cut-off relay via the sleeve lead, and proceeded to ring the called subscriber.

Supervision (line signaling) was supplied by a District circuit, similar to the cord circuit that plugged into a line jack on a switchboard. The District circuit supervised the calling party, and when the calling party went on-hook, it released the ground on the sleeve lead, thus releasing all selectors except the final, which returned down to their start position to make ready for further traffic. The final selector circuit was not supervised by the district circuit, and only returned to normal once the called party hung up. Some District frames were equipped with the more complex supervisory and timing circuits required to generate coin collect and return signals for handling calls from payphones.

Many of the urban and commercial areas where Panel was first used had message rate service rather than flat rate calling. For this reason the line finder had a fourth wire known as the "M" lead. This enabled the District circuit to send metering pulses to control the subscriber's message register. The introduction of direct distance dialing (DDD) in the 1950s required the addition of automatic number identification equipment for centralized automatic message accounting.

The terminating section of the office was fixed to the structure of the last four digits of the telephone number, had a limit of 10,000 phone numbers. In some of the urban areas where Panel was used, even a single square mile might have three or five times that many telephone subscribers. Thus the incoming selectors of several separate switching entities shared floor space and staff, but required separate incoming trunk groups from distant offices. Sometimes an Office Selector Tandem was used to distribute incoming traffic among the offices. This was a Panel office with no senders or other common control equipment; just one stage of selectors and accepting only the Office Brush and Office Group parameters. Panel Sender Tandems were also used when their greater capabilities were worth their additional cost.

== Sender ==
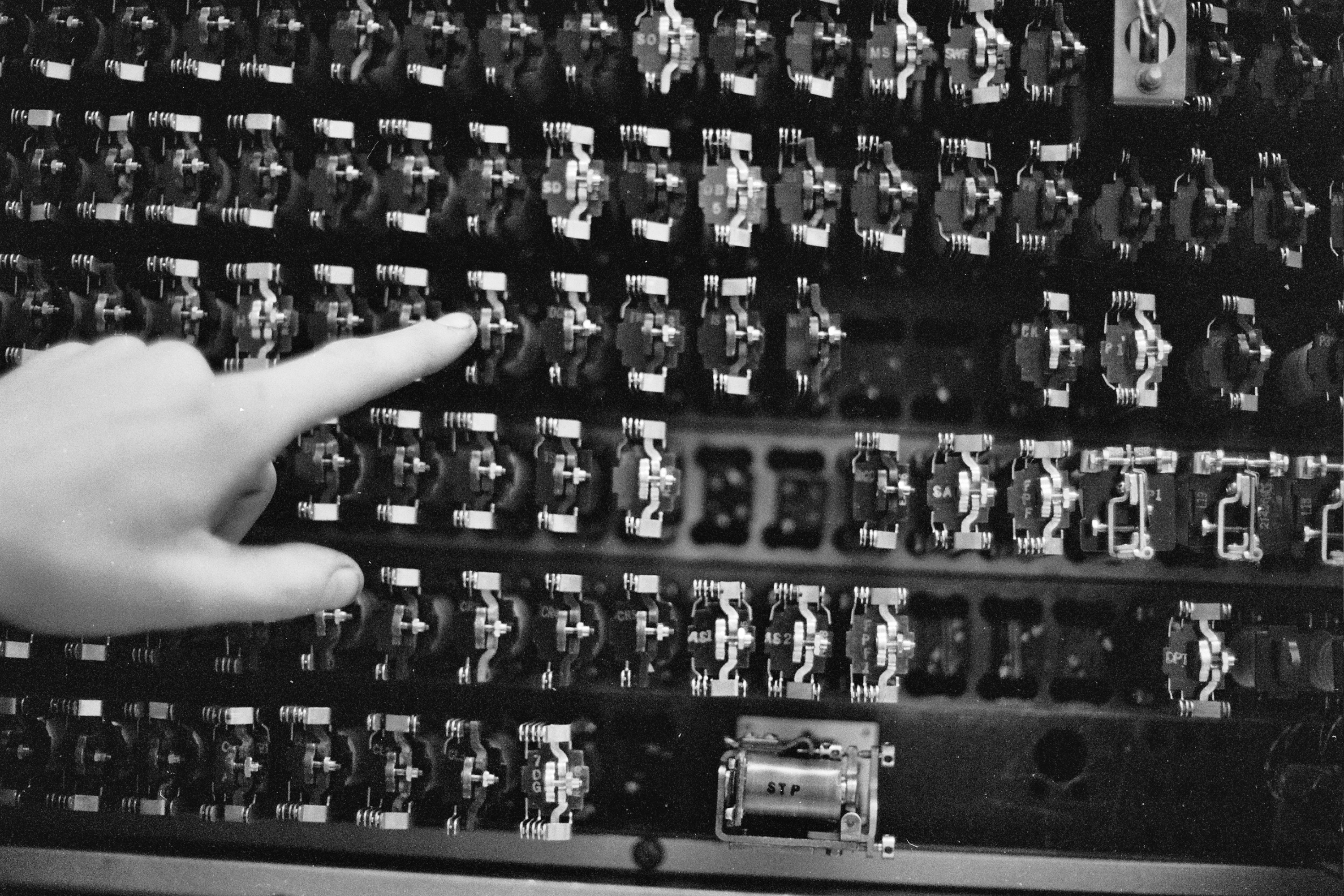
Closeup of all-relay type sender

While the Strowger (step-by-step) switch moved under direct control of dial pulses that came from the telephone dial, the more sophisticated Panel switch had senders, which registered and stored the digits that the customer dialed, and then translated the received digits into numbers appropriate to drive the selectors to their desired position: District Brush, District Group, Office Brush, Office Group, Incoming Brush, Incoming Group, Final Brush, Final Tens, Final Units.

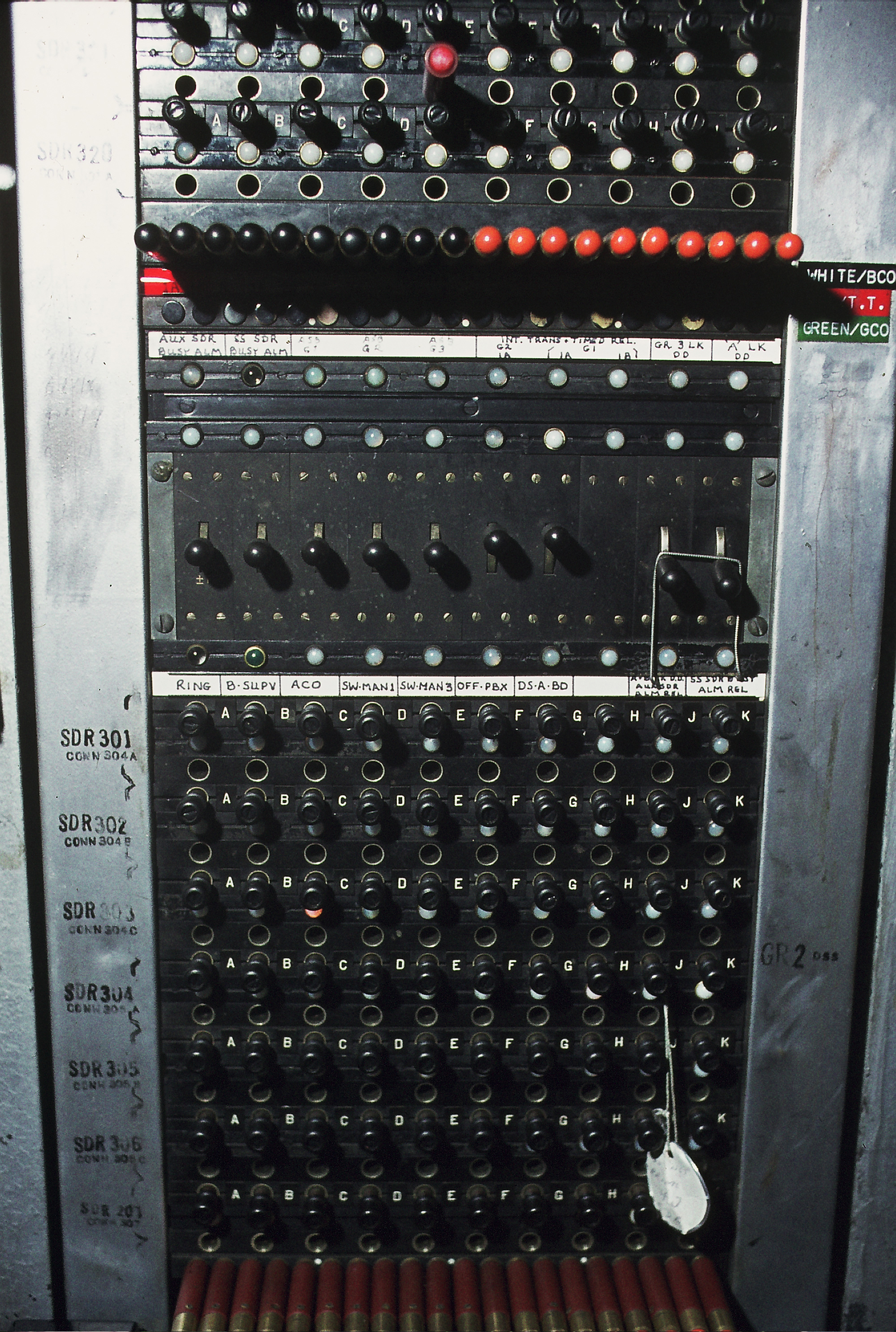
Sender alarm and Make Busy panel

The use of senders provided advantages over the previous direct control systems, because they allowed the office code of the telephone number to be decoupled from the actual location on the switching fabric. Thus, an office code (for example, "722") had no direct relationship to the physical layout of the trunks on the district and office frames. By the usage of translation, the trunks could be located arbitrarily on the physical frames themselves, and the decoder or translator could direct the sender to their location as needed. Additionally, because the sender stored the telephone number dialed by the subscriber, and then controlled the selectors itself, there was no need for the subscriber's dial to have a direct-control relationship to the selectors themselves. This allowed the selectors to hunt at their own speed, over large groups of terminals, and allowed for smooth, motor controlled motion, rather than the staccato, momentary motion of the step-by-step system.

The sender also provided fault detection. As it was responsible for driving the selectors to their destinations, it was able to detect errors (known as trouble) and alert central office staff of the problem by lighting a lamp at the appropriate panel. In addition to lighting a lamp, the sender held itself and the selectors that were under its control out of service, which prevented their use by other callers. Upon noting the alarm condition, staff could inspect the sender and its associated selectors, and resolve whatever trouble occurred before returning the sender and selectors back to service.

When the sender's job was complete, it connected the talk path from the originating to the terminating side, and dropped out of the call. At this time, the sender was available to handle another subscriber's call. In this way, a comparatively small number of senders could handle a large amount of traffic, as each was only used for a short duration during call setup. This principle became known as common control, and was used in all subsequent switching systems.

== Signaling and control ==
Revertive Pulsing (RP) was the primary signaling method used within and between panel switches. The selectors, once seized by the sender or another selector, would begin moving upwards under motor power. Each terminal the selector passed would send a pulse of ground potential along the circuit, back to the sender. The sender counted each pulse, and when the correct terminal was reached, the sender then signalled the selector to disengage the upward drive clutch and stop on the appropriate terminal as determined by the sender and decoder. The selector then either began its next selection operation, or extended the circuit to the next selector frame. In the case of the final frame, the last selection would result in connection to an individual's phone line and would begin ringing.

As the selectors were driven upwards by the motors, brushes attached to the vertical selector rods wiped over commutators at the top of the frame. These commutators contained alternating segments serving as insulators or conductors. When the brush passed over a conductive segment, it was grounded, thereby generating a pulse which was sent back to the sender for counting. When the sender counted the appropriate number of pulses, it cut the power to the solenoid in the terminating office, and caused the brush to stop at its current position.

Calls from one panel office to another worked very similarly to calls within an office by use of revertive pulse signalling. The originating office used the same protocol, but inserted a compensating resistance during pulsing so its sender encountered the same resistance for all trunks. This is in contrast to more modern forms of forward pulsing, where the originating equipment will directly outpulse to the terminating side the information it needs to connect the call.

== Compatibility ==
Later systems maintained compatibility with revertive pulsing, even as more advanced signaling methods were developed. The Number One Crossbar, which was the first successor to the Panel system also used this method of signaling exclusively, until later upgrades introduced newer signaling such as Multi-frequency signaling.

Panel was initially installed in cities where many stations still used manual (non-dial) service. For compatibility with manual offices, two types of signaling were supported. In areas with mostly machine switches and only a few manual switchboards, Panel Call Indicator (PCI) signaling transmitted the called number to the "B" Board Machine Incoming operator, which lit lamps on the operator's desk at the terminating manual office. The lamps illuminated digits on a display panel corresponding to the number dialed. The manual operator connected the call to the appropriate jack, and then repeated the process for the next incoming call. In areas with mostly manual switches, the Call Annunciator signaling system was used to avoid installing lamp panels at every operator station. The Call Annunciator used speech recorded on strips of photographic film to verbally announce the called number to the answering operator.

PCI signaling continued to be used for tandem purposes, decades after its original need had disappeared. In the 1950s, auxiliary senders were added for storing more than eight digits, and sending by multi-frequency (MF) signaling for direct distance dialing (DDD).

Calls from manual offices to panel offices required the "A" board, or outgoing operator, to request the number from the caller, connect to an idle trunk to the distant exchange, and relay the desired number to the B Board Manual Incoming Call operator, who keyed it to the Panel machine for setting up the incoming and final frames to the called telephone number.

== Motor power ==
The panel switch is an example of a power drive system, in that it used 1/16 horsepower motors to drive the selectors vertically to hunt for the desired connection, and back down again when the call was completed. In contrast, Strowger or crossbar systems used individual electromagnets for operation, and in their case the power available from an electromagnet limits the maximum size of the switch element it can move. With Panel having no such restriction, its dimensions were determined solely by the needs of the switch, and the design of the exchange. The driving electric motor can be made as large as is necessary to move the switch elements. Thus, most calls required only about half as many stages as in earlier systems. Motors used on panel frames were capable of operating on alternating (AC) or direct current (DC), however they could only be started with DC. In the event of an AC power failure the motor would switch to its DC windings, and continue running until AC power was restored.

== Maintenance and testing ==
Because of its relative complexity compared to direct control systems, the Panel system incorporated many new types of testing apparatus. At the time of its design, it was decided that maintenance should be done on a preventative basis, and regular testing of the equipment would be used to identify faults before they became severe enough to affect subscribers. To this end, multiple types of test equipment were provided. Test equipment generally took the form of either a wooden, switchboard-like desk, a wheeled cart, known as a "Tea Wagon", or a small box-type test set that could be carried to the apparatus that required testing. The central test location in the office was known as the "OGT Desk", or "Trouble Desk", and took the form of a large wooden desk with lamps, jacks, keys, cords, and a voltmeter. This desk served as the central point for analysis and trouble resolution.

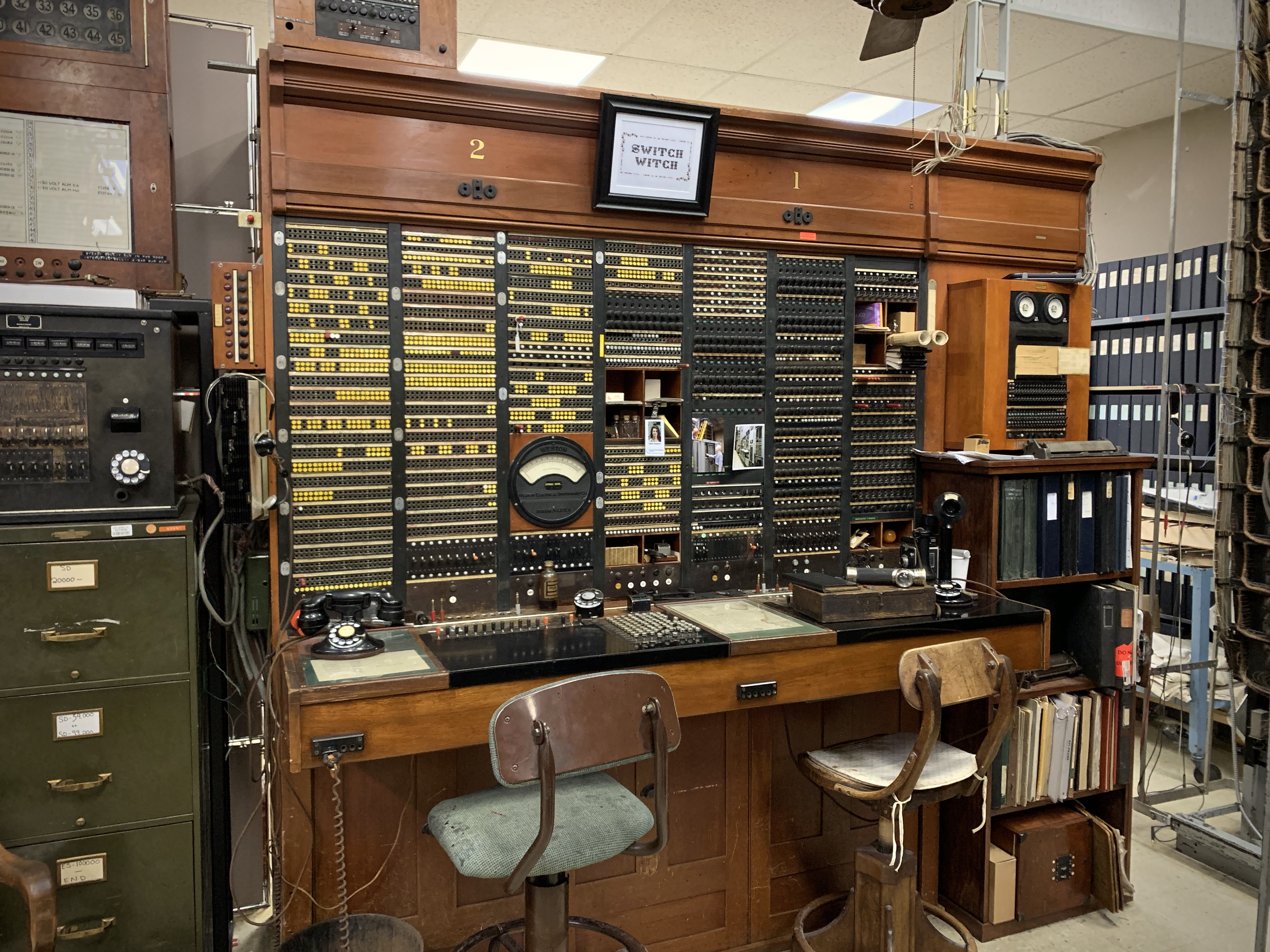
An OGT (OutGoing Trunk test) desk at the Connections Museum, Seattle. This desk was part of the RAinier/PArkway panel office, and was installed in 1923.

Other test apparatus included frame-mounted equipment that was used to routine commonly used circuits within the office. These included an automatic routine sender test frame, and an automatic routine selector test frame. When testing was to be done manually by a switchman, he or she used a Tea Wagon, which was wheeled to the apparatus to be tested, and plugged into jacks that were provided for this purpose.

== Upgrades ==
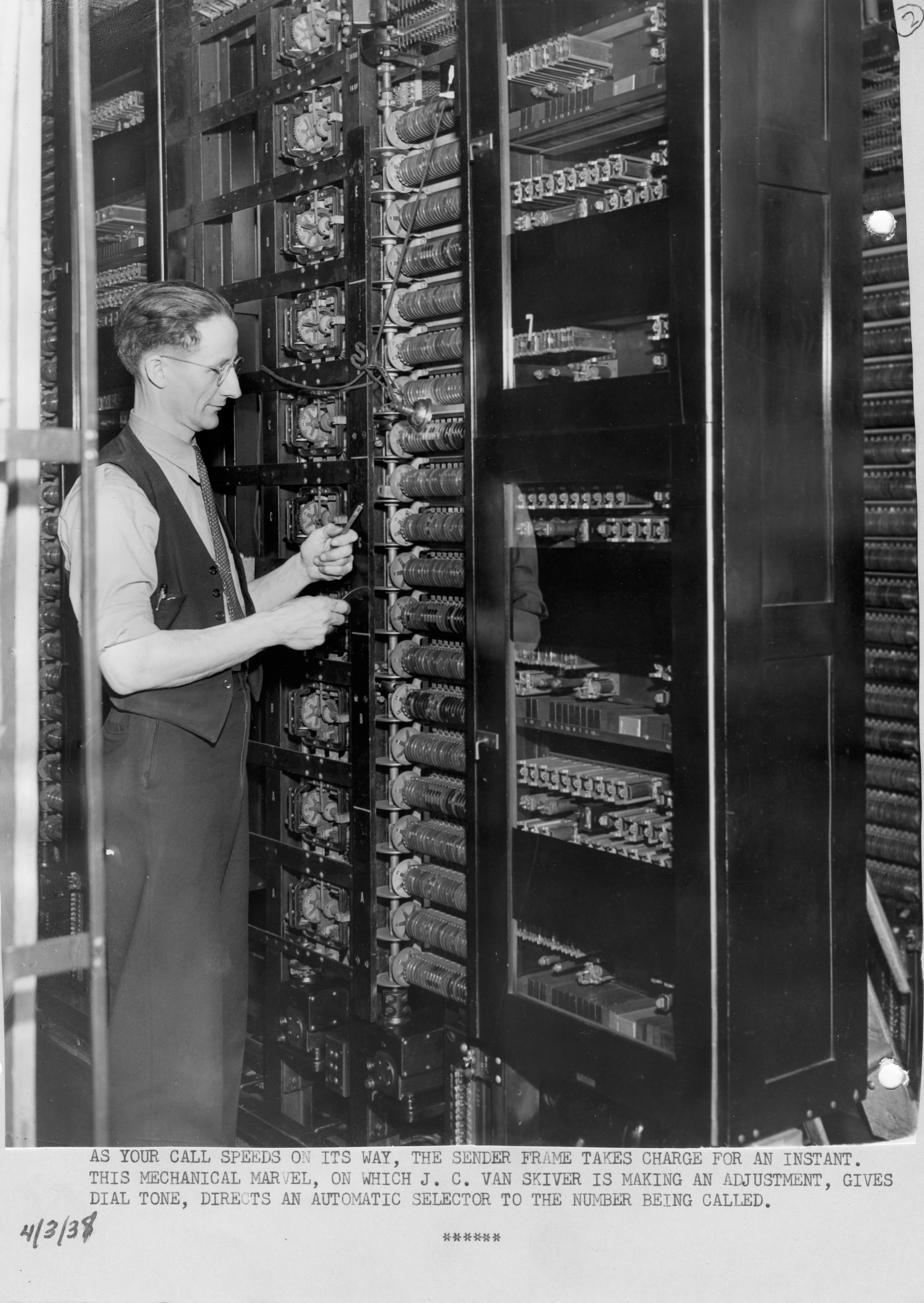
A switchman works on a two-digit translator type sender.

Throughout its service time, the Panel system was upgraded as new features became available or necessary. Starting in the mid-1920s, such upgrades improved the initial design. Major attention was initially focused on improving the sender. Early two- and three-digit type senders stored dialed digits on rotary selector switches. The senders employed translators to convert the dialed digits into the appropriate brush and group selections needed to complete the call. As better technology became available, Panel senders were upgraded to the all-relay type. These were more reliable, and in addition, replaced the translator equipment with decoders, which also operated entirely with relays, rather than with motor-driven apparatus, which yielded faster call completion, and required less maintenance.

Another important improvement involved a fundamental change in the electrical logic of the switching system. The Panel originally shipped in a ground cut-off (GCO) configuration, wherein the cut-off relay had ground potential on one side of its winding at all times. A busy line condition was indicated by -48 volt battery applied to the other side of the cut-off relay winding, and thus at the sleeve lead. This would be detected by the final selector as it hunted over the terminals. Starting in 1929, all newer panel systems were deployed as battery cut-off (BCO) systems. In this revision, the presence of ground and -48V was reversed. Battery was constantly applied to one side of the cut-off relay, and the presence of ground on the other side of the winding indicated the line was busy. This change necessitated a fundamental change in the design of the system, and was undertaken for many reasons. One of the most notable was that GCO offices were more prone to fire.

The line finder was also improved during the system's lifetime. Originally, the line finder frame had a capacity of 300 lines each, and used 15 brushes (vertical hunting segments) on each rod. This was intended to reduce hunting time as there were more brushes hunting over a shorter distance. As these line finders went into service, however, it became evident that 15 brushes on each vertical selector rod were quite heavy, and needed springs and pulleys at the top of the frame to compensate for their mass. Later line finders used 10 brushes and rearranged the layout to accommodate 400 lines per line finder frame. This increased capacity while eliminating the need for compensating equipment.

Western Electric estimated that the design changes of 1925 to 1927 accounted for a 60% reduction in overall costs for the Panel system.

The following table presents early major panel system upgrades:

Year	Line finder type	Sender connection type	Maximum number of senders per group	Sender type	Cut-off relay type
1920	Line Switch (200-type)	Sender Selector	22	Translator	GCO
1920	300 pt line finder	Sender Selector	22	Translator	GCO
1924	400 pt line finder	Sender Selector	22	Translator	GCO
1926	400 pt line finder	Rotary Link	44	Translator	GCO
1927	400 pt line finder	Panel Link	100	Translator	GCO
1928	400 pt line finder	Panel Link	100	Decoder	GCO
1929	400 pt line finder	Panel Link	100	Decoder	BCO
