= Photochemical internalization =

Photochemical internalization (PCI) is a drug and gene therapy delivery method originally developed to improve the release of macromolecules and hydrophilic chemotherapeutic agents from endosomes and lysosomes to the cytosol of targeted cancer cells. PCI is based on the use of endosomal and lysosomal localizing amphiphilic photosensitizers which, after activation by light, induce photochemical reactions resulting in destruction of endocytic membranes mediated by reactive oxygen species (ROS). The photochemical destabilization of the membrane of the endocytic vesicle result in an endosomal escape of the entrapped drugs. The technology was invented by Kristian Berg at the Norwegian Radium Hospital.
