= Connections Museum Seattle =

Museum in Washington, US

- Former names: Herbert H. Warrick Jr. Museum of Communications, Vintage Telephone Equipment Museum
- Established: 1989
- Location: Georgetown, Seattle, Washington
- Coordinates: 47°32′26″N 122°19′25″W
- Founders: Don Ostrand and Herb Warrick
- Website: www.telcomhistory.org/connections-museum-seattle/

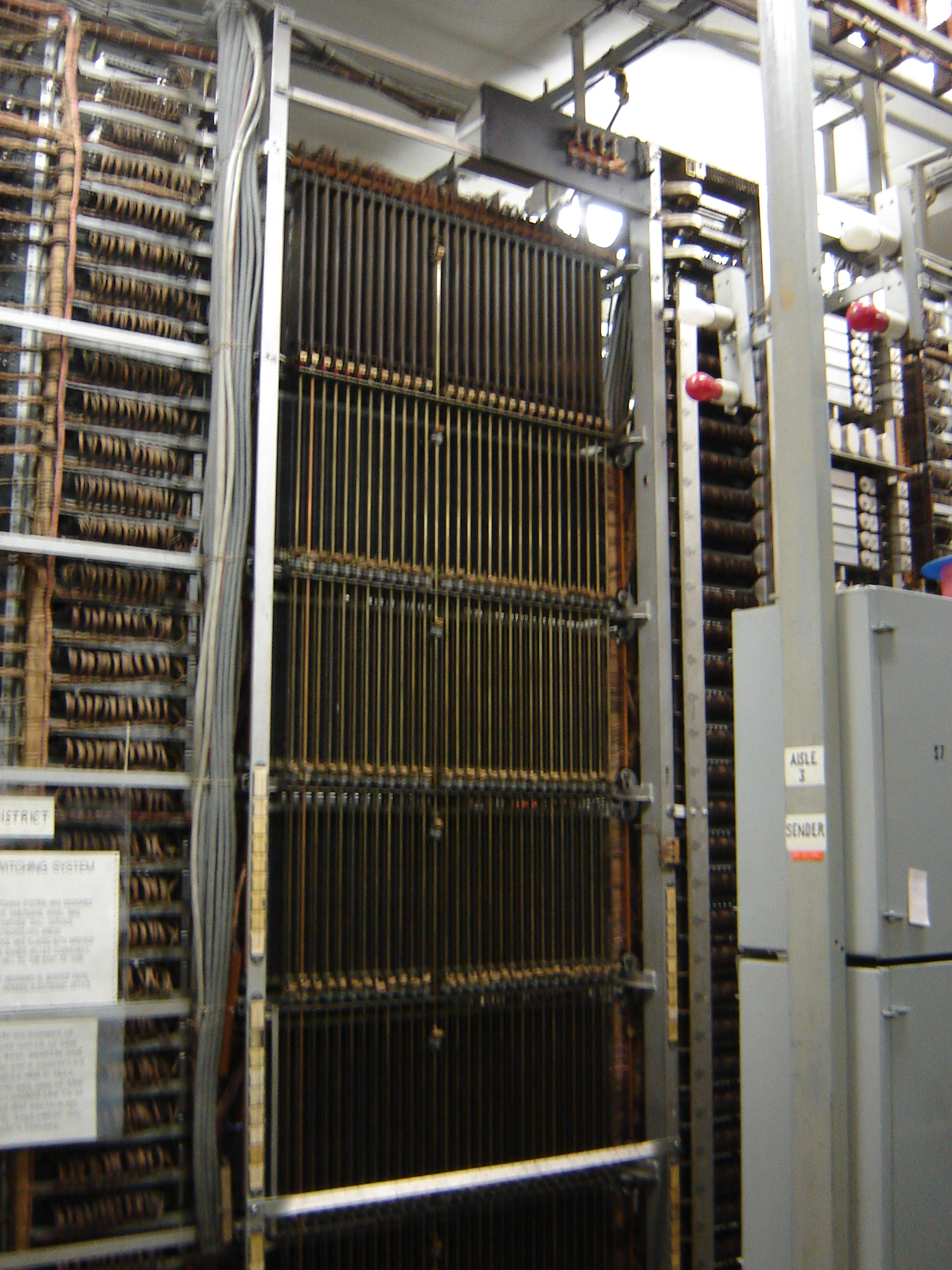
Panel switch district selector frame at the Connections Museum

The Connections Museum Seattle (formerly the Herbert H. Warrick Jr. Museum of Communications; originally the Vintage Telephone Equipment Museum) is located in Lumen's Duwamish Central Office at East Marginal Way S. and Corson Avenue S. in Seattle's Georgetown neighborhood. It "reveals the history of the telephone and the equipment that makes it all work." It features vintage equipment from AT&T, Western Electric, Pacific Northwest Bell, USWest, and other organizations.

The museum was originally sponsored by the Washington Telephone Pioneers, and is now a part of Telecommunications History Group, based in Denver, along with Connections Museum Colorado and THG Archives (also in Denver).

== History ==
The museum was founded by Don Ostrand and Herb Warrick, both employees of Pacific Northwest Bell. As a result of the Modification of Final Judgement in 1984, the AT&T monopoly was broken up, and an organizational mandate required Pacific Northwest Bell to modernize their aging telephone switching equipment. Realizing that this was perhaps the last opportunity to save examples of vintage electromechanical switches, Warrick requested that Pacific Northwest Bell (PNB) make arrangements to transfer ownership of selected equipment to the Telephone Pioneers and allow them to set up a museum somewhere in Seattle.

Originally envisioned to be one of three telephone museums in the Pacific Northwest, this was the only one that materialized. Work started in 1985, and the museum opened to the public in Fall of 1989. Frames of electromechanical switching equipment were brought in from existing central offices in Washington state, and lifted to the third floor by cranes. From there, volunteers rewired the equipment to make it functional once again.

In 2016 the museum was featured on a popular YouTube channel run by Tom Scott, as part of the "Things You Might Not Know" series.

In 2025, the museum acquired two more significant collections: Phil McCarter's private collection, and the collection of the American Museum of Telephony, in Soquel, CA. Those collections will be exhibited in two new museums; one in Seattle, and one in Arvada, CO.

== Collection ==
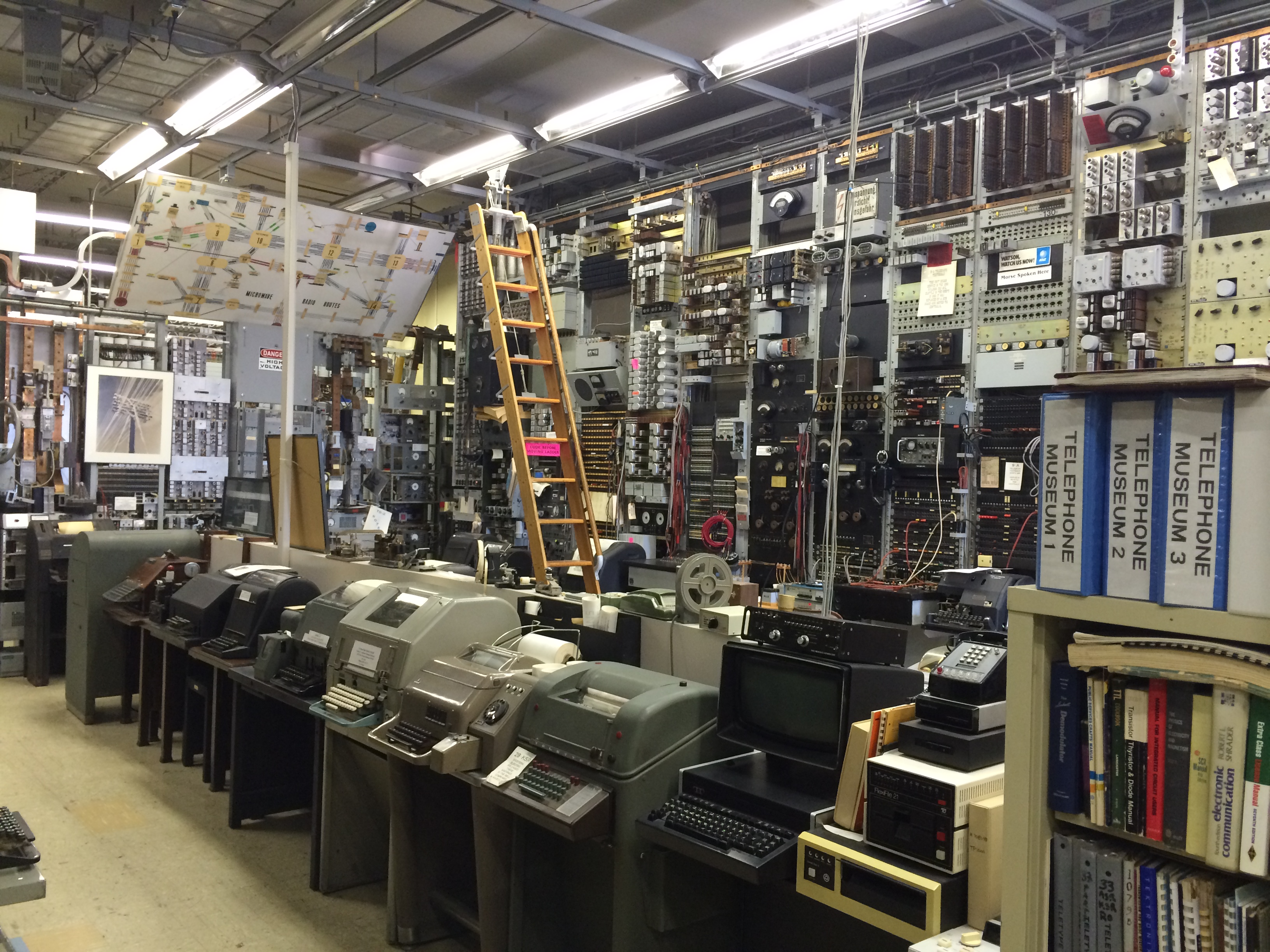
Teletype, microwave, and radio equipment at the museum

The museum has the following notable items in its collection:

- 1923 Panel Switch from Seattle's RAinier/PArkway exchange
- 1942 No. 1 Crossbar from Seattle's LAkeview exchange
- 1958 No. 5 Crossbar from the ADams exchange on Mercer Island
- 1974 2ESS electronic switching system
- 1976 3ESS electronic switching system from Crosby, WA
- No. 3 Crossbar from Nevada
- Nortel DMS-10 switch donated by ADTRAN in Huntsville, AL
- Two 5ESS Switching Systems, acquired in 2025 and 2026
- North Electric CX 100, from Lester, Washington, originally installed in the U.S.S. California
- 355 Step-By-Step (SXS) equipment
- 701-B, 750, 755, and 756 dial PBXs
- Teletype equipment from the 1920s through the 1980s
- Two pairs of working AT&T Picturephones
- A red K6 GPO telephone box, flown to Seattle from the UK

Most of the artifacts in the museum's collection are functional, and are maintained regularly by volunteers. Some switching systems, particularly the Panel Switch, No. 1 Crossbar, and 3ESS offices, are the only remaining switches of their type in the world that are still functioning. The No. 5 crossbar office is one of two that operate in a museum setting in the U.S. (the other is at The Telephone Museum in Ellsworth, Maine). Although they are no longer connected to the PSTN, visitors can make calls between the switches in the museum. A computer program has been set up to continually simulate calls and keep the equipment exercised.
