= Ceridian-UCLA Pulse of Commerce Index =

The Ceridian-UCLA Pulse of Commerce Index (PCI) is based on real-time diesel fuel consumption data for over-the-road trucking and serves as an indicator of the state and possible future direction of the U.S. economy. By tracking the volume and location of fuel being purchased, the index closely monitors the over-the-road movement of raw materials, goods-in-process, and finished goods to U.S. factories, retailers, and consumers.

Working with economists at UCLA Anderson School of Management and Charles River Associates, Ceridian provides the index monthly and also offers companies access to more detailed fuel-use information.

(Appears to be discontinued as of June 2012)

== Compiling and analyzing the data ==
Through Ceridian’s electronic card payment services for the transportation industry, diesel sales for freight haulage can be tracked and analyzed on a yearly, monthly, weekly and daily basis. Millions of these fuel transactions are processed each year, and the data provides evidence about the status and direction of the U.S. economy.

Each time a road truck makes a diesel fuel purchase using a Ceridian card, Ceridian's database captures the location and number of gallons pumped into the tank. The data is then analyzed to provide a detailed picture of road trucking activity along U.S. interstates and at cities, shipping ports, manufacturing centers, and border crossings with Canada and Mexico.

== Pulse of Commerce Index and the broader economy ==
Unlike other economic indicators that rely on surveys or have a lag, the PCI uses real-time consumption data, offering insights into the economy before the monthly Industrial Production number is released.

"This is the first source of data on diesel sales in almost real time. Diesel in the USA is the fuel used almost exclusively to move goods and materials. If there is an increase in diesel sales – it is pretty good evidence the economy is improving."

As the index changes, it offers real comparisons to past performance that captures a solid picture of what has happened, while showing the direction of the overall U.S. economy. This insight is invaluable to businesses, manufacturers, retailers and municipalities as they determine business strategy, plan for growth, or prepare for and manage a downturn.

"Back-testing of the data to 1999 shows the index closely matches growth in real gross domestic product and changes in the Federal Reserve's industrial production data.

"The index's main advantage over other data is its timeliness. The index is scheduled for release at 8:00 a.m. (ET) on the 10th day of each month--about four or five days before the Fed's industrial report. Because Ceridian can access all fuel purchases in real time, the index won't be subject to revisions."

== History ==
The first PCI was issued on February 10, 2010, and covers data for January 2010. Each monthly report includes historical information for preceding months and years. The PCI is distributed on or near the 10th of every month. Deeper historical data and customized reports are also available.
