= Plymouth Chamber of Commerce & Industry =

Devon and Plymouth Chamber of Commerce
- Abbreviation: D&PCC
- Formation: 1813
- Legal status: Not-for-profit organisation
- Purpose: Chambers of commerce in the Devon county area
- Location: Plymouth, Unit 5 Derriford Business Park, Plymouth PL6 5QZ
- Region served: Devon and Cornwall
- CEO: Stuart Elford
- Website: https://devonchamber.co.uk/

The Devon and Plymouth Chamber is the largest Chamber of Commerce in the South West of England. It is also an accredited member of the British Chambers of Commerce (BCC).

The Chamber is a membership organisation designed to provide a forum for businesses in both the private and public sectors in Devon and to bring about and sustain a favourable business climate conducive to wealth creation in the city.

== History ==
The Devon and Plymouth Chamber is the third oldest Chamber in the UK. It was formed under the presidency of the first Earl of Morley originally as the Plymouth Chamber of Commerce in response to a decision made by the Government in 1813. The Government of the day initiated a 25% cutback in the Royal Navy and as a result the local business area of Devonport was hit hard. In response the civic and business leaders held an emergency meeting at Plymouth's Guildhall and, wishing to exert direct local control over the towns economic future, they formed a Chamber of Commerce.

== Present day ==
The Devon and Plymouth Chamber of Commerce offers services that are common for most Chambers such as membership, networking events, and training courses. It also offers an international trade service.

The Chamber is involved with the Plymouth 2020 urban redevelopment, and other initiatives such as Plymouth's Better Together project, and work in preparing Plymouth to host the Americas Cup in September 2011.

The Chamber has set three main missions to help improve Plymouth and its clients. One is focused on the macroeconomics and business community of Plymouth and surrounding regions, where the aim is to help give clients a better understanding of this.

Another part of this mission is the intention to focus on growing Plymouth's business economy. The Chamber helps build clients business through a structured (but non compulsory) programme of networking and business events, a number of which are hosted and arranged by the Chamber itself.

The Chamber finally acts as a central source and conduit of crucial business information and intelligence. This usually means the Chamber has its best interest to stay ahead when it comes to being knowledgeable about the latest business affairs.
