= PPCI =

PPCI may refer to:

- Primary percutaneous coronary intervention, a cardiac medical procedure (sometimes "pPCI")
- Progressive Party of Côte d'Ivoire, a political party between 1946 and 1951
- Progressive Party of the Cook Islands
- Partially premixed charge compression ignition, in diesel engines
