= Rotary system =

Electromechanical telephone switch

The rotary machine switching system, or most commonly known as the rotary system, was a type of automatic telephone exchange manufactured and used primarily in Europe from the 1910s. The system was developed and tested by AT&T's American engineering division, Western Electric, in the United States, at the same time when Western Electric was also developing the Panel switch. When AT&T selected the Panel System for large American exchanges, development and sales of the No. 7-A Machine Switching System, its formal commercial name, were transferred to Western Electric's international division in Belgium. In Europe and other continents the system was met with considerable commercial success.

The Rotary and Panel systems were very different systems, but both used the same newly developed component technology, such as Western Electric's latest relays, and the principles of the Lorimer system of revertive pulsing and preselection. The Rotary switches were smaller than the Panel system, and served only 200 rather than 500 stations. The initial version was the model 7A. It was succeeded by 7A1 and 7A2 and a rural system had the designation 7D.

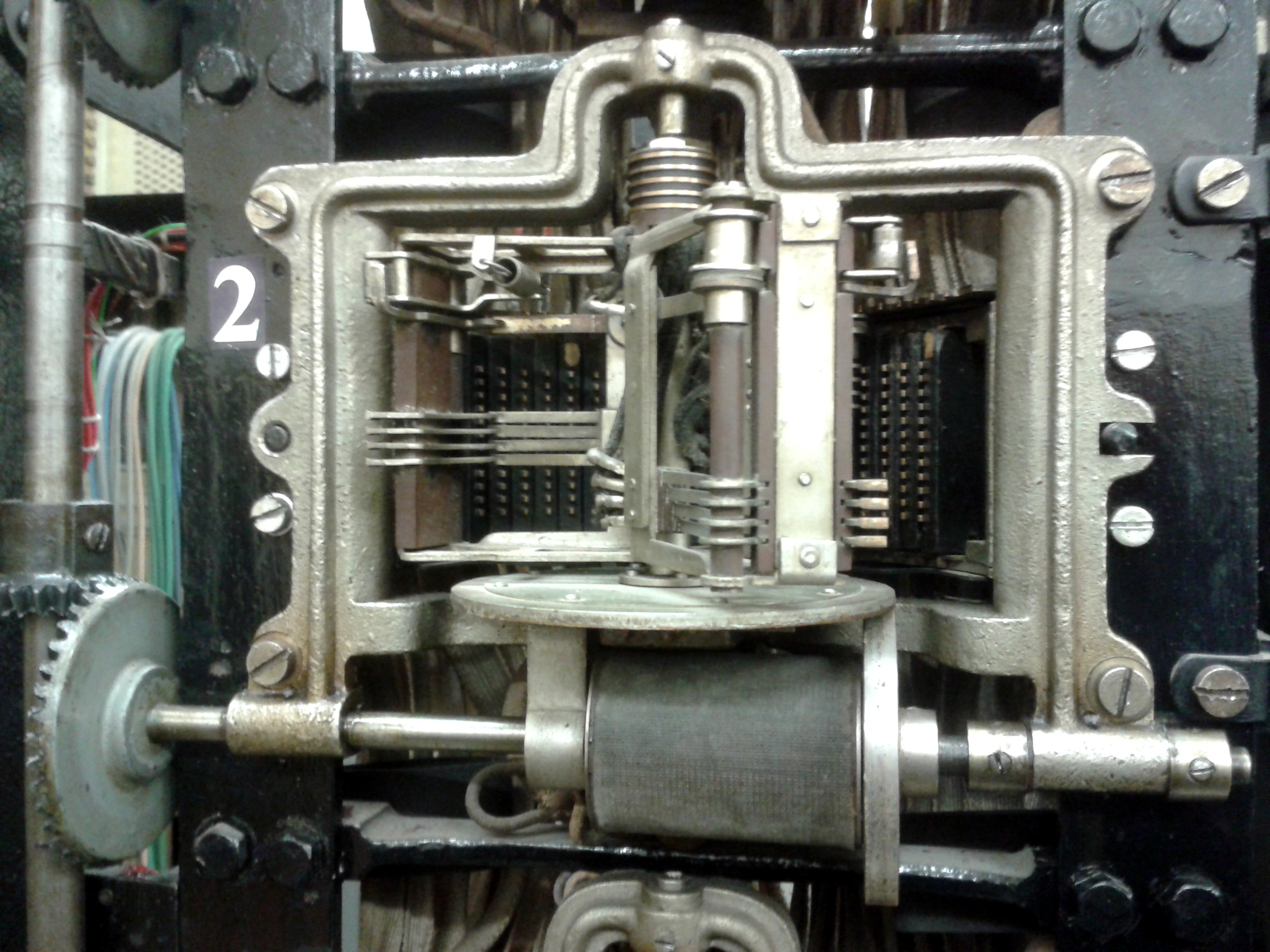
Western Electric friction drive Line Finder (No. 7001 type)

== Technology ==
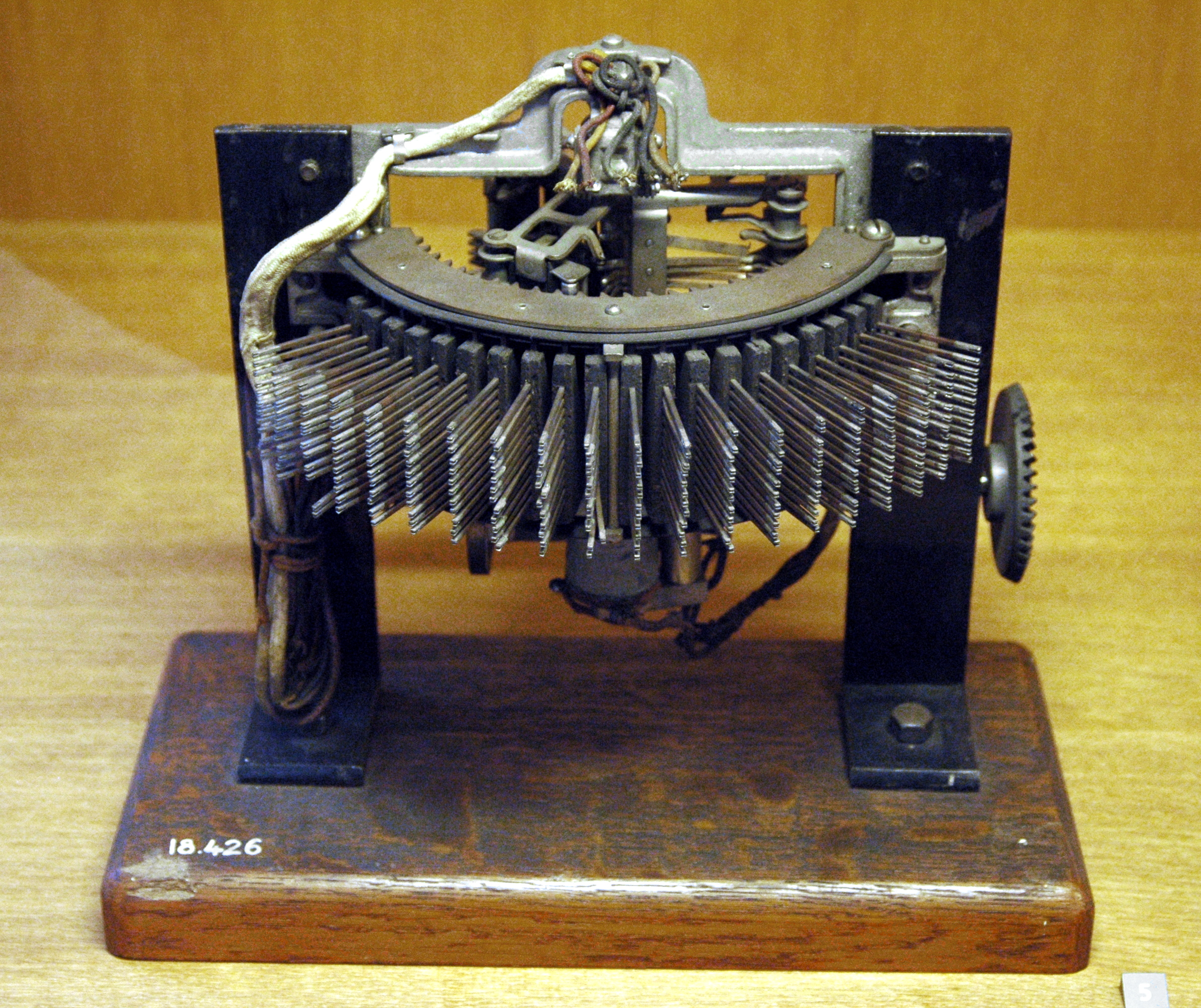
An example of a Western Electric 7A Rotary (Bird-cage) Line Finder assembly. The horizontal shaft is driven by a gear and when the Line Finder's electromagnet is energized, a flexible disc at the base of the Line Finder's brush carriage is engaged through friction to the horizontal shaft's driving disc, causing the brush carriage to rotate.

The Rotary system used 1st and 2nd linefinders; when a customer picked up the phone all free linefinders in the group drove until one picked that customer line. Calls were switched over two, three or four group selection stages followed by a final selector. An office could start with two group selection stages for local calls (a first group level would serve 2000 lines), and be expanded to three group selection stages if it outgrew say 2000 or 4000 lines, depending on the number of first group levels required for other offices in a multi-exchange area.

== Deployment ==
While the Panel system was chosen for American large cities, the Rotary system was selected for use in Europe and manufactured at the Bell Telephone Manufacturing factory of Western Electric (the International Bell Telephone Company) in Antwerp, Belgium. The first exchanges were installed in England at Darlington (10 October 1914) and Dudley (9 September 1916). However the British General Post Office standardised on the Step-by-Step (SXS) system in 1922, and subsequently the SXS Director system for London and other large cities. Six Rotary exchanges were installed in the city of Hull, between 1922 and 1929, where telephones service was supplied by Hull Corporation rather than by the GPO.

The Rotary system was chosen for The Hague, (the Netherlands) and New Zealand in 1913–14, but manufacture was disrupted by the German invasion of Belgium. Dies were moved to England, then to the Hawthorne Works of Western Electric in America (manufacture resumed at Antwerp in 1920). The first exchanges cutover (placed into service) were Masterton, New Zealand on 31 May 1919, followed by Courtenay Place and Wellington South in Wellington on 18 October 1919, and Scheveningen, The Hague on 7 January 1920. The Hague was the first multi-office area served entirely by the No. 7-A machine system with the cutover of the new Centrum office on 15 February 1924. There were four offices equipped with 23,000 lines; Bezuidenhout, Centrum (or Hofstraat), Hague West (or Marnix), and Scheveningen. The system was owned by The Hague Municipality; initially only 5,000 lines were fully automatic, the rest were semi-automatic.

The Rotary semi-automatic system 7A was chosen for public experiment in October 1912 by the French Administration Postes Télégraphes Téléphones. The first semi-automatic Rotary 7A (McBerty design) was turned on in Angers in November 1915, and the second in Marseille on 19 April 1919 (Marseille-Colbert I). Only two Rotary 7A semi-automatic were installed in France. All the other Rotary exchanges in France were 7A1 fully automatic (Gerald Deakin mechanics). The 1 January 1928, The semi-automatic Rotary 7A of Marseille-Colbert 1 was fully automated, maximum capacity lines 10,000. Angers stayed semi-automatic only, capacity approx 3,000 lines. Rotary fully automatic 7A1 was deployed in Nantes on 29 October 1927, Marseille-town (first Marseille-Dragon on 5 May 1928) and Paris (first Carnot on 22 September 1928) and Region of Paris in large and exclusive proportion. All the French Rotary 7A and 7A1 were exclusively manufactured in France, with French workers, essentially by ITT-LMT company, and, in subsidiary by French Ericsson Society and Society Grammont.

In 1925 IT&T purchased International Western Electric, formerly Bell Telephone Manufacturing Company, in Belgium, from AT&T; as the Bell System complied with regulators to sell its overseas manufacturing interests to settle anti-trust action. In the 1930s, ITT grew through purchasing German electronic companies Standard Elektrizitaetsgesellschaft and Mix & Genest, both of which were internationally active companies.

Apart from the Netherlands (38,100 lines) and New Zealand (48,400 lines), other countries that had installed or ordered Rotary equipment by 1925 were Australia, Belgium (29,000 lines), Denmark, England, France, Hungary, Italy, Norway (41,160 lines), Romania, South Africa, Sweden and Switzerland. There was a total of 104,615 lines in service, and 137,330 lines "proceeding". Subsequently, at Zurich, Switzerland; the mechanical registers were replaced by PDP-11 computers.

In Kingston-upon-Hull which had the only municipal telephone system in the United Kingdom (see KCOM Group), operated by the Hull City Council, rotary exchanges were operated from 1922 to 1975. In the rest of the United Kingdom, the telephone system was operated by the British Post Office (later British Telecom), which had installed a Rotary exchange at Darlington (10 October 1914) and Dudley (9 September 1916), but subsequently decided to use the Strowger system in small and medium cities and the Director system in London (from 1927) and five other large British cities.

A Rotary system was installed in Auckland, New Zealand in the central city telephone exchange (WLT) in Wellesley Street in 1924. Other Auckland exchanges with Rotary systems included Devonport 1 and 2 (DA1 and DA2) and Mount Eden 1 (MOD1). These four exchanges were still operating until at least 1970.

=== Working exhibit ===
In Christchurch, New Zealand at the Ferrymead Heritage Park, the Ferrymead Post & Telegraph Historical Society has a working exhibit of the 7A Rotary Switching system. The display includes a bay of 7A1 Line Finders and a bay of 7A1 Registers.

In Auckland, New Zealand, a rotary exchange was set up as an exhibit at the Museum of Transport and Technology at Western Springs.

In Budapest, Hungary, at the Museum of Telephones (Telefónia Múzeum) there is a still workable 7A1 Rotary Switching system. (The exhibition has been closed until the first part of 2019 due to some reconstruction works.)

At the Norwegian Telecom Museum in Oslo, Norway there is a 7A2 exchange.

In Vámosgyörk, Hungary, at the Hungarian State Railways telecommunications main body Miskolc (Magyar Államvasutak Zrt. Távközlési Főnökség Miskolc) there is a still workable 7D PBX Rotary Switching system. Fully functional but not in operation, which has been replaced by an MD 110 system. It is kept as a museum style exhibit. It can serve up to 100 subscribers in number group 41 (4100 to 4199).

In Szentes, Hungary, at the Hungarian State Railways telecommunications main body Szeged (Magyar Államvasutak Zrt. Távközlési Főnökség Szeged) there is a still workable 7D PBX Rotary Switching system. Fully functional in operation. It is kept as a museum style exhibit. It can serve up to 200 subscribers in number group 75 and 76 (7500 to 7699).

== Notes ==
- Note: Electrical Communication was published quarterly by the International Standard Electric Corporation. Subsidiaries of the company included the Bell Telephone Manufacturing Company, Antwerp and Standard Electric or Standard Telephones and Cables in various countries. Deakin and Turkhud were with the Bell Telephone Manufacturing Company, Antwerp; Shrimpton was with Standard Telephones and Cables (Australasia).
