= Henrik Moltke =

Danish investigative journalist and filmmaker

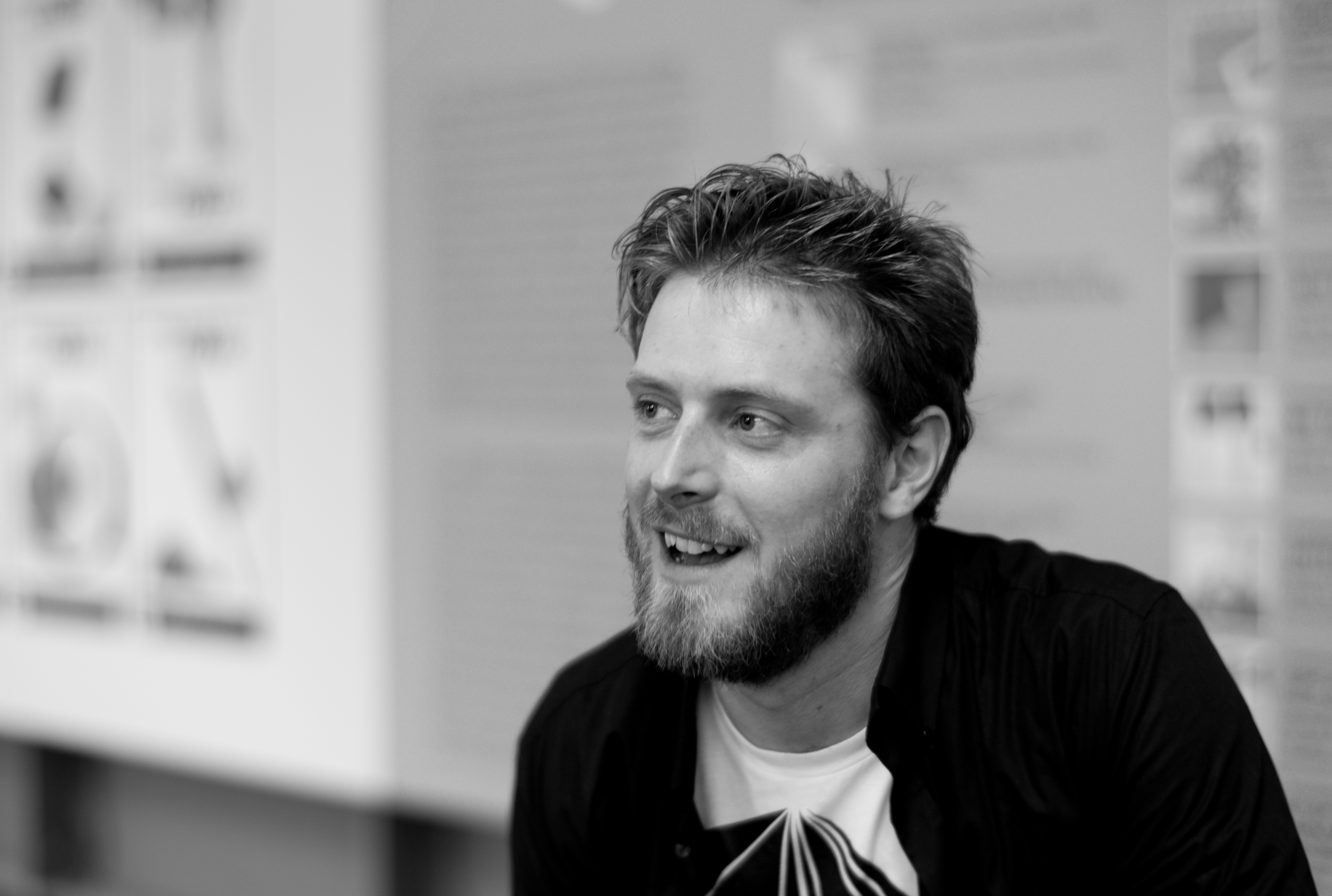
- Moltke in 2007
- Born: 9 April 1976 (age 50); Odense, Denmark
- Occupations: Journalist, filmmaker
- Years active: 2000–present
- Website: moltke.website

Henrik Moltke (born 9 April 1976) is a Danish investigative journalist and documentary filmmaker. He is known for contributing to expose the physical infrastructure behind the National Security Agency's secret domestic surveillance partnership with AT&T, one of the largest corporate-government intelligence collaborations in American history. He identified 33 Thomas Street in New York City as TITANPOINTE, a secret NSA surveillance hub, and located eight additional NSA monitoring facilities hidden inside AT&T buildings across the United States. He is also a contributor to the Academy Award-winning documentary Citizenfour and co-directed Project X (2016) with Poitras.

== Career ==
Moltke studied literature and rhetoric at the University of Copenhagen and holds an M.A. in journalism from Goldsmiths, University of London.

He began his career at DR, Denmark's public broadcaster, where he worked as a journalist and radio documentarist from 2000 to 2014. From 2014 to 2019 he reported for The New York Times, The Intercept, and ProPublica, primarily on surveillance and telecommunications. He served as editor at Altinget in 2019 before returning to DR as science and technology correspondent from 2019 to 2025, covering artificial intelligence, cybersecurity, and digital policy for Denmark's largest news organization. At DR he created and hosted Prompt, a weekly podcast on artificial intelligence that became one of Denmark's most-followed technology programmes. Since 2026 he has worked independently as a journalist, speaker, and consultant on technology, AI, and cybersecurity.

Earlier in his career, Moltke co-founded Creative Commons Denmark (2005–2010) and served as European Project Lead at the Mozilla Foundation (2010–2011).

== Notable work ==
=== AT&T and NSA surveillance ===
In August 2015, Moltke published a front-page New York Times investigation with Pulitzer Prize winners Julia Angwin, James Risen, and Laura Poitras, revealing the scope of AT&T's cooperation with the NSA under the FAIRVIEW program. The story, also published by ProPublica, exposed what the Times described as AT&T's "extreme willingness to help" the NSA conduct warrantless surveillance of vast quantities of international and domestic internet traffic.

In November 2016, Moltke and Ryan Gallagher identified 33 Thomas Street, a windowless brutalist skyscraper in Lower Manhattan, as the NSA surveillance facility code-named TITANPOINTE. The investigation, published in The Intercept, drew on classified Snowden documents and open-source research including FCC licensing records, which Moltke used to confirm that the building housed the only AT&T satellite earth station in New York State, linking it to the NSA's SKIDROWE satellite intelligence system. A companion documentary, Project X, co-directed by Moltke and Laura Poitras and featuring voice-over performances by Rami Malek and Michelle Williams reading from classified NSA documents, was released simultaneously by Field of Vision. The title was taken from the building's original architectural codename in John Carl Warnecke's 1960s design drawings.

In June 2018, Moltke and Gallagher published "The Wiretap Rooms" simultaneously in The Intercept and ProPublica, identifying eight AT&T facilities in major American cities used by the NSA for large-scale internet surveillance under the FAIRVIEW program. Moltke located the facilities by cross-referencing classified NSA maps with AT&T network topology documents and CLLI codes extracted from publicly available AT&T engineering presentations.

=== Snowden reporting and Citizenfour ===
From 2013 to 2014, working with Sebastian Gjerding, Anton Geist, and Laura Poitras at Dagbladet Information, Moltke reported on NSA surveillance of the UN climate summit in Copenhagen, the global RAMPART-A surveillance program, and GCHQ's systematic monitoring of climate conferences, all based on documents provided by Edward Snowden. Moltke contributed research and filming to Poitras's Academy Award-winning documentary Citizenfour (2014), which documented Snowden's disclosure of classified NSA material, and is credited in the film.

=== Other work ===
Moltke co-directed Good Copy Bad Copy (2007), a documentary on copyright and digital culture, with Andreas Johnsen and Ralf Christensen. He contributed to Poitras's Astro Noise exhibition at the Whitney Museum of American Art (2016) and the Signal Flow installation at Manifesta 12 in Palermo (2018).

== Awards ==
- Prix Italia Jury Prize for radio documentary (Håbets pris, 2005)
- New Media Days honorary award (2011)
- FUJ Prize for outstanding investigative journalism, with Sebastian Gjerding, Anton Geist, and Laura Poitras (2014)
