= Title 47 CFR Part 68 =

Title 47 CFR Part 68 is a section of the Code of Federal Regulations of the United States that regulates the direct electrical connection of telecommunications equipment and customer premises wiring with the public switched telephone network, certain private line services, and connection of private branch exchange (PBX) equipment to certain telecommunication interfaces.

== Scope ==
- The direct connection of telecommunications equipment and customer premises wiring with the public switched telephone network and certain private line services, such as
  - foreign exchange lines at the customer premises end
  - the station end of off-premises stations associated with PBX and Centrex services
  - trunk-to-station tie lines at the trunk end only
  - switched service network station lines, i.e., common control switching arrangements
- The direct connection of
  - all PBX and similar systems to private line services for tie trunk type interfaces,
  - off-premises station lines, and (3) automatic identified outward dialing (AIOD) and message registration.

Part 68 rules provide the technical and procedural standards under which direct electrical connection of customer-provided telephone equipment, systems, and protective apparatus may be made to the nationwide network without causing harm and without a requirement for protective circuit arrangements in the service-provider networks.

The equivalent European regulation is called TBR21.
