= 33 Thomas Street =

Skyscraper in Manhattan, New York, US

- AT&T Long Lines Building
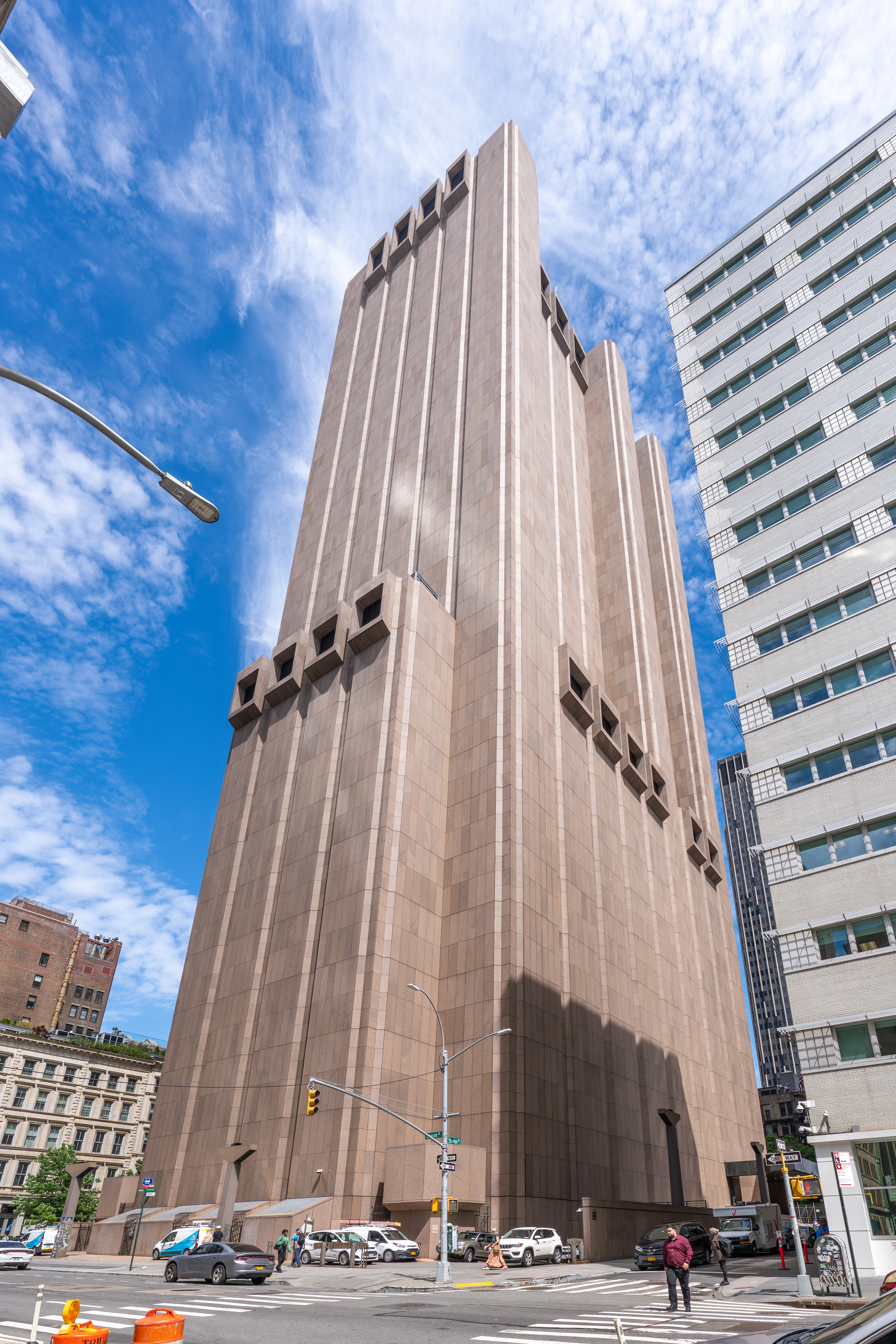
- Interactive map of the 33 Thomas Street area

General information
- Status: Completed
- Type: Utility
- Architectural style: Brutalist
- Location: Manhattan, New York City, New York, U.S.
- Coordinates: 40.71678°N 74.00610°W
- Construction started: 1969
- Completed: 1974
- Opening: 1974
- Owner: AT&T Corporation

Height
- Roof: 550 ft (170 m)

Technical details
- Floor count: 29

Design and construction
- Architects: John Carl Warnecke & Associates
- Developer: AT&T
- Structural engineer: Shmerykowsky Consulting Engineers

33 Thomas Street (also known as the AT&T Long Lines Building) is a 550-foot-tall (170 m) windowless skyscraper in the Tribeca neighborhood of Lower Manhattan in New York City, New York, United States. It stands on the east side of Church Street, between Thomas Street and Worth Street.

Designed in the Brutalist architectural style, it is a telephone exchange or wire center building which contained three major 4ESS switches for interexchange carrier services (used for long distance calling), as well as a number of other switches used for competitive local exchange carrier services. However, it is not used for incumbent local exchange carrier services, and is not a central office. Its CLLI code is NYCMNYBW.

It has been reported that the building is used as a National Security Agency (NSA) mass surveillance facility.

== History ==
The location was previously the site of cast-iron buildings, typical of the area, the façades of which were removed for preservation before demolition.

Construction of the building was started in 1969 and completed in 1974. The building was a core part of the AT&T Long Lines Department, housing solid-state switching equipment that required tight security and ample space. The Long Lines Department became AT&T Communications in 1984 after the breakup of the Bell System. The AT&T Long Lines Building is now commonly known by its street address, 33 Thomas Street.

AT&T gradually moved switches and other facilities from their former AT&T Long Lines headquarters building at 32 Sixth Avenue, just a few blocks away, completing the move by 1999. 33 Thomas is still used for telephone switching, but some of the space is also used for highly secure datacenters.

On September 17, 1991, management failure, power equipment failure, and human error combined to disable AT&T's central office switch at 33 Thomas. More than five million calls were blocked, and the Federal Aviation Administration private lines were also interrupted, disrupting air traffic control to 398 airports serving most of the northeastern United States. The problem arose when the electric utility, Consolidated Edison, asked AT&T to temporarily stop drawing electricity from the grid and instead use the building's on-site generators. The request was part of a previous load shedding agreement, and the switch had been performed successfully in the past, but on this occasion, it failed. After switching power sources, standard procedure was to check all the equipment power supplies, known as DC plants, for problems. But due to scheduled training, the check was not performed, and one plant went on battery backup. The alarms were not detected until it was too late to maintain uninterrupted power.

After the destruction of the World Trade Center in the September 11, 2001 attacks, AT&T had to relocate a number of services previously occupying 11,612 ft^{2} (1,078.8 m^{2}) at the old 1 WTC. 33 Thomas Street was among the buildings that welcomed some of the displaced services, together with 32 Avenue of the Americas (then the head offices of the company), 811 Tenth Avenue, and 75 Broad Street.

In 2016, journalists Ryan Gallagher and Henrik Moltke reported in The Intercept that the building is a National Security Agency (NSA) mass surveillance hub code-named TITANPOINTE.

== Architecture ==
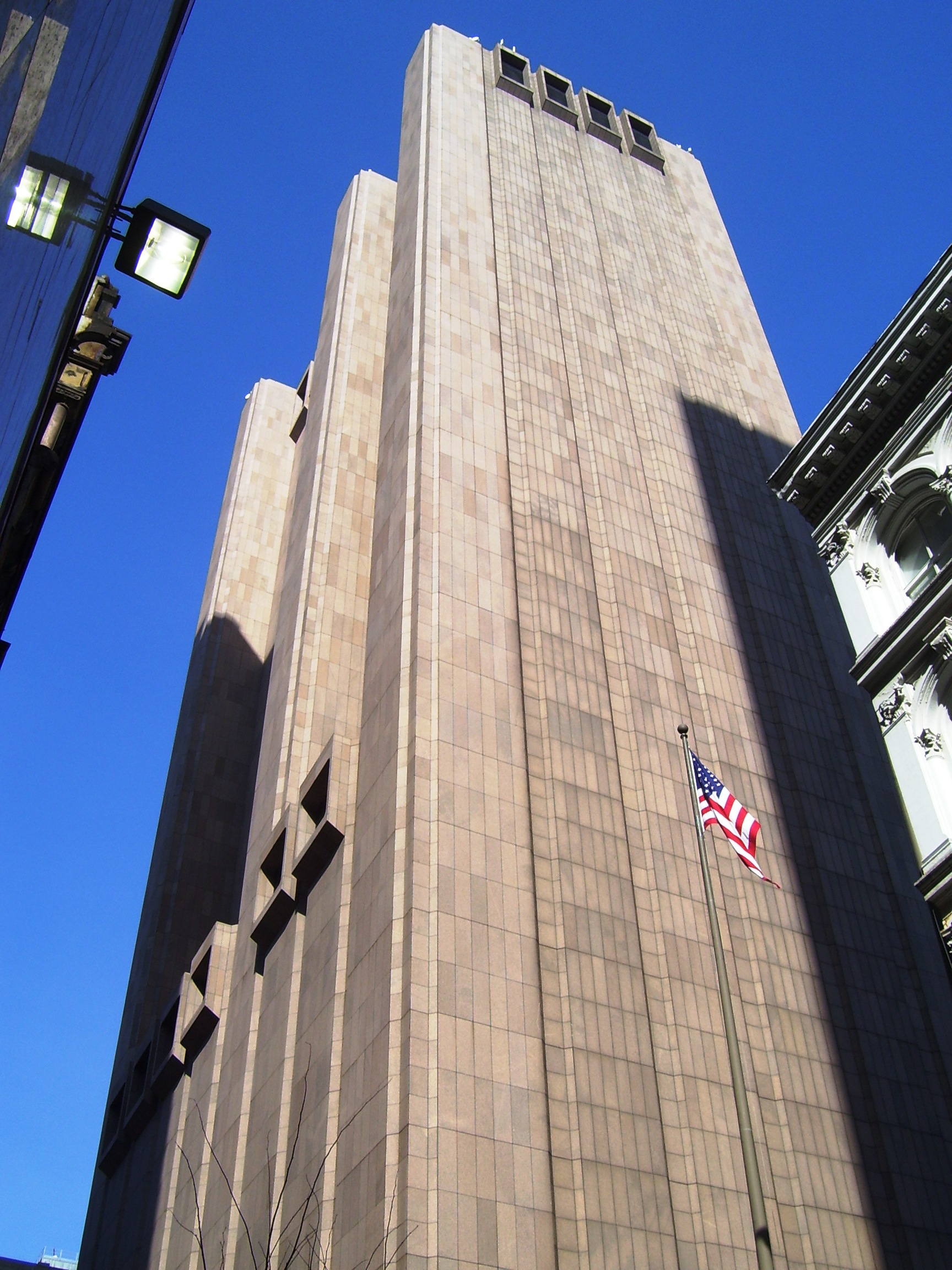
View looking up from the adjacent street

The Long Lines Building was designed by architect John Carl Warnecke & Associates and completed in 1974. Its Brutalist style has been praised, with The New York Times saying it is a rare building of its type in Manhattan that "makes sense architecturally" and that it "blends into its surroundings more gracefully" than any other skyscraper nearby.

=== Facade ===
The exterior walls of the building have no windows, and are instead entirely covered with precast concrete panels clad with flame-treated textured Swedish granite. There are six large protrusions from the rectangular base which house air ducts, stairs and elevators. There is a series of large, protruding ventilation openings on the 10th and 29th floors. William H. Whyte claimed that it features the tallest blank wall in the world.

=== Features ===
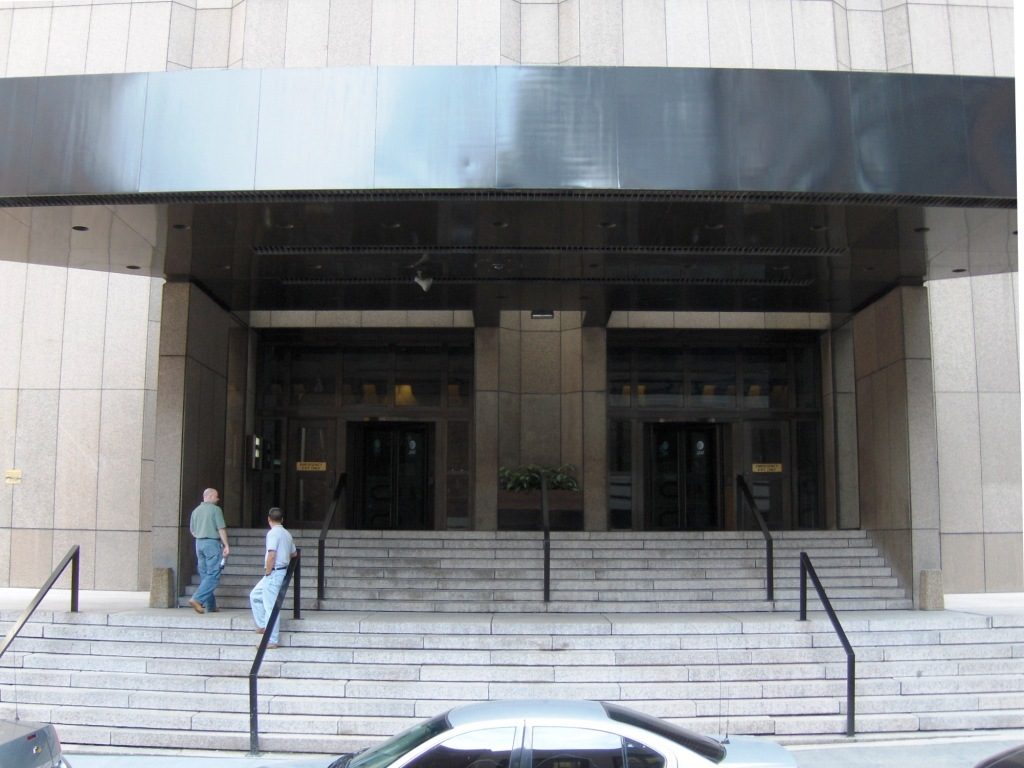
Street level view of the entrance to the building showing the elevated entry foyer

As it was built to house telephone exchange equipment, the average floor height is 18 feet (5.5 m), considerably taller than in an average high-rise. The floors are also unusually strong, designed to carry live loads of 200 to 300 pounds-force per square foot (9.6 to 14.4 kPa). It is often described as one of the most secure buildings in America, and was designed to be self-sufficient with its own gas and water supplies along with generation capabilities and protected from nuclear fallout for up to two weeks after a nuclear blast.

== Usage ==
The building is a telephone exchange or wire center building which contained three major 4ESS switches used for interexchange (long distance) telephony, two owned by AT&T Corp. and one formerly owned by Verizon (decommissioned in 2009). It also contains a number of other switches used for competitive local exchange carrier services, but is not used for incumbent local exchange carrier services, and is not a central office. The CLLI code for this facility is NYCMNYBW.

The building likely contains a mass surveillance hub operated by the National Security Agency, code-named TITANPOINTE. An investigation by journalists Ryan Gallagher and Henrik Moltke at The Intercept, and the companion documentary short film Project X co-directed by Moltke and Laura Poitras, both identified TITANPOINTE by drawing on the surveillance disclosures of Edward Snowden. The investigation ties the facility to a nearby Federal Bureau of Investigation building, and its rooftop equipment to NSA's SKIDROWE satellite intelligence system. A 2018 follow-up investigation by Gallagher and Moltke, published in The Intercept as "The Wiretap Rooms", identified eight AT&T facilities in major American cities used by the NSA for large-scale internet surveillance under the FAIRVIEW program.
