= Circuit ID =

Data and voice identifier

A circuit ID is a company-specific identifier assigned to a data or voice network connection between two locations. This connection, often called a circuit, may then be leased to a customer referring to that ID. In this way, the circuit ID is similar to a serial number on any product sold from a retailer to a customer. Each circuit ID is unique, so a specific customer having many circuit connections sold to them would have many circuit IDs to refer to those connections. As an example of a use of the circuit ID, when a subscriber/customer has an issue (or trouble) with a circuit, they may contact the Controlling Local Exchange Carrier (Controlling LEC) telecommunications provider, identifying the circuit that has the issue by giving the LEC that circuit ID reference. The LEC would refer to their internal records for this circuit ID to take corrective action on the designated circuit.

== Telecom circuit ID formats ==
Although telecommunication providers are not required to follow any specific standard for circuit IDs, many do. In the United States, LECs typically generate circuit IDs based on Telcordia Technologies' Common Language Information Services. Using the Telcordia standards for circuit naming allow a LEC the ability to build a certain amount of intelligence into the name of a circuit. The way Telcordia has developed circuit IDs, different types of circuit connections require different formats for the circuit ID. In each format, different segments of the ID have very specific meaning.

At one time, abbreviations used for circuit types were meaningful (for example, HC for high capacity) but the complexity of the business no longer allows for it. Now, with many different technologies and uses for circuit connections, different types of circuits may use different types of circuit ID formats that provide more meaning for that type of circuit. Below are "examples" of how one telecommunications provider, CenturyLink, has published their choice for circuit IDs for three different types of circuit connections.

=== Carrier-facility format ===
For "carrier circuits", CenturyLink uses a format like: AAAAA/BBBBBB/CCCCCCCCCCC/DDDDDDDDDDD

Where:

- A = Prefix: 3–5 Alphanumeric characters. This is a unique identifier. Required.
- B = Facility Type: 1–6 Alphanumeric characters. Describes the "type" of facility circuit. Required.
- C = CLLI Code for the A-location: 8 or 11 alphanumeric characters. Required.
- D = CLLI Code for the Z-location: 8 or 11 alphanumeric characters. Required.

Example:

HN101/T3U/MPLSMNDT000/GLVYMNORIII

The above example circuit ID represents an unframed T3 circuit between two locations in Minnesota with a "serial number" of HN101. Some telecom providers also build a bit of intelligence (or meaning) into this unique prefix information. For instance, a T3U circuit type that carries a specific type of network traffic might use the HN designation at the beginning followed by a number in the 100-block for another specific purpose, 200-block for yet another purpose, and so on.

For more on Carrier Facility formatted circuit IDs using Telcordia's standards, see Common Language Facility Identification.

=== Serial-number format ===
For "special circuits", CenturyLink uses a format like: AA/BBCC/DDDDDD/EEE/FFFF/GGG

Where:

- A = Prefix: 1–2 alphanumeric characters. Optional.
- B = Service Code: 2 Characters. Required. The type of service this circuit is providing.
- C = Service Code Modifier: 2 Characters. Required. Modifies the meaning of the service code, often identifies different billing options.
- D = Serial Number: 1–6 digits. Required.
- E = Suffix: 3 character suffix to the serial number. Optional, but rarely used.
- F = Company Code: 2–4 alphabetic characters (eg. NW, MS, PN, CTL, GTEW, NRLD, UDMN, FROT...) Required. Identifies the Controlling LEC.
- G = Segment: 1–3 alphanumeric characters. Optional for point-to-point circuits, but usually found with multi-point DS0 circuits.

Examples:

32/HFGS/012345/NW = T3 Circuit controlled by Qwest
73/HCGS/123456/000/CC = T1 Circuit controlled by Consolidated Communications
44/AQDU/987654/000/G3 = HDSL Circuit controlled by G3 Telecom

Parts of this circuit ID may also have additional intelligence (or meaning) built in. For instance, the Prefix may or may not be based on the LATA from one end of the circuit or the other.

=== Telephone-number format ===
For "telephone based data circuits", CenturyLink uses a format like: AA/BBCC/DDD/EEE/FFFF/GGGGG/HHH

Where:

- A = Prefix: 1-2 alphanumeric characters. Required if it exists.
- B = Service Code: 2 alphabetic characters. Required for non-DSL numbered circuits.
- C = Service Code Modifier: 2 alphabetic characters. Required. Modifies meaning of the service code, often identifies different billing options.
- D = NPA: 3 digits. This is a required field. Numbering plan area code.
- E = NXX: 3 digits. This is a required field. Central office (exchange) code.
- F = Line: 4 digits. This is a required field.
- G = Extension: 1-5 alphanumeric characters. Optional.
- H = Segment: 1–3 alphanumeric characters. This is a rarely used optional field.

Example:

54/UDNV/303/111/5555/99/1 = a circuit serving phone number 303-111-5555, ext. 99, on segment 1

== Circuit designations in the United Kingdom ==
Each carrier (Public Telecomms Operator) in the UK has its own form of designation. The Post Office/BT system is described here from the original term ‘Engineering Circuit Designation’. Other PTOs have their own scheme and would be suitable for inclusion.

The Post Office or BT system historically used PW and R, optionally followed by a Region and/or Area code, followed by a number of digits between 4 and 6 for rented, analogue private lines. A Region code might have been LR for London Region or ER for Eastern Region, and for an Area L/NW for North West London or CB for Cambridge. In all but the rarest instances these must have been migrated to AX by the Analogue Upgrade project to digitise as much as possible for FDM Offload, (no) dc path uniformity and remote access in maintenance.

Between 2 locations then:

- AX nnnnnn designates an analogue (2w or 4w) presented link.
- KX nnnnnn designates a digitally presented link up to 64 kbit/s.
- NX nnnnnn designates a digitally presented link from 128 up to 1,024 kbit/s.
- MX nnnnnn designates a digitally presented link from 2 Mbit/s upwards

Each of the prefixes may have an addition making MX/GB, KX/INT for example.

There are many specialist designations covering bearers for other purposes, for example for IP and bearers provided for other PTOs. One common other use has been IMUK and IMGB for the 2 Mbit/s link from the public exchange to a customer location for the delivery of ISDN30 in the earlier DASS and more recent I.421 format.

The trend has been that the local UK area suffixes are no longer used though legacy lines with these may still be in place.

== International circuit designations for correspondent International Private Leased Circuits (IPLCs) ==
These were known as CCITT, now ITU-T, designations. In the interests of international recognition, a protocol with recognisable town names has been used.

The format is: <Earliest alphabetical town or city> – <second alphabetical town or city> <Type> <Serial>

Towns and cities have abbreviations accepted by the 2 corresponding PTOs and the CCITT/ITU-T.

Examples are:

- AMS = Amsterdam
- BS = Bristol
- DSSD = Düsseldorf
- FFTM = Frankfurt-am-Main
- KOB = Copenhagen
- L = London
- MDD = Madrid
- PS = Paris

Original CCITT Leased Circuit Types were:

Analogue

P = Audio circuit (however transmitted over distance) presented as Audio for voice

FP = Audio circuit (however transmitted over distance) presented as Audio for Fax modem

DP = Audio circuit (however transmitted over distance) presented as Audio for Data modem

XP = Audio circuit (however transmitted over distance) presented as Audio and switched by customer for alternate use by Voice or Data modem

L – PS P4 was the fourth analogue line between Paris and London normally used for voice transmission at that time. DSSD-L XP2 was the fourth analogue line between Düsseldorf and London alternately used for voice and data at that time.

Digital

NP became the Type designator for most correspondent International digital links.

BS – MDD NP12 and KOB – PS NP34 would have been typical uses of the scheme for links between Bristol & Madrid and Copenhagen & Paris.

Notes

The choice of letters in designating major town and cities could be seen to reflect a short form of the name in the language of the country and also to disambiguate with similarly named locations. København being the Danish home version of Copenhagen attracted KOB as the abbreviation. FFTO was the designation for Frankfurt-an-der-Oder, where there was the clear need to disambiguate references from FFTM.

The serial or the numbered occurrence of a link between two PTOs between 2 cities was usually the next free number in the system, but the CCITT allowed for the re-use of old serial numbers after a period of 6 months. A customer ordering 3 links could be allocated DP23, DP24 and then DP6 between 2 major cities. (DP6 had been ceased over 6 months earlier).

It can be considered that the serial or last number of the type of correspondent link between two places made the link unique but did lead to problems, for example when a major PTO in one country was setting up links in correspondent relations with more than one PTO in another country.

The development was away from correspondent IPC links to a situation where one facilities provider could provide the link over the international part and sometimes as afar as the distant end customer. This was the result of liberalisation and competition in home and overseas markets. In some cases the facilities provider would carry the link to their PoP in the distant country and then rent a national or local tail from the PTO in that country. That would attract a designation particular to that area and not reflect its international connection significance.

== See also ==
- Common Language Information Services
- Outline of telecommunication
