= Catherine Goetze =

Technology educator and creator known for CatGPT

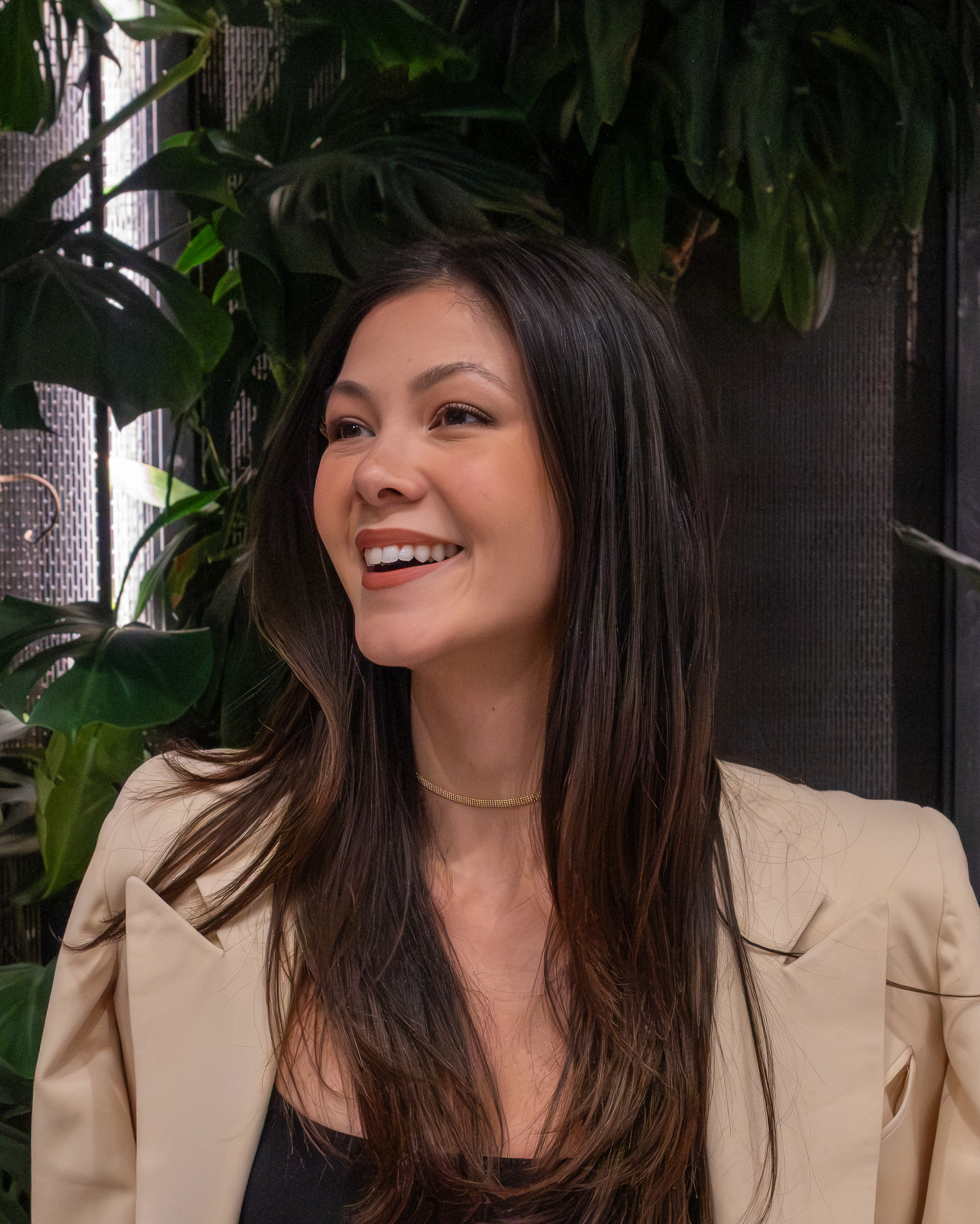
- Goetze in 2026
- Other names: CatGPT; Cat G
- Education: Stanford University (BA)
- Occupations: Technology educator; content creator; entrepreneur
- Known for: CatGPT; Physical Phones
- Website: www.askcatgpt.com

Catherine Goetze, also known online as Cat Goetze and CatGPT, is a technology educator, content creator and entrepreneur. She is the creator of CatGPT, an online media brand focused on artificial intelligence, and of Physical Phones, a project that produces Bluetooth-enabled landline-style devices intended to help users manage smartphone use. Goetze has built a large following on TikTok and Instagram under the handle @askcatgpt, where she posts videos about AI education and digital wellbeing.

== Career ==
=== Cath in College ===
Goetze began filming video skits with her siblings in middle school using her parents' camcorder and later worked on video journalism in high school. During her freshman year at Stanford University she started documenting her daily life and answering questions from prospective students on a YouTube channel and blog that became Cath in College.

Cath in College was a vlog and blog that presented her Stanford experience in a diary-like style, showing scenes such as studying, parties and dorm life alongside reader Q&As. By 2018, Cath in College had grown to over 20,000 subscribers and could draw up to 100,000 views per video, with a largely high school audience using it as a window into everyday life at a highly selective university.

=== CatGPT and AI education ===
After working in the technology industry, Goetze launched CatGPT, an online media brand centered on short-form explanations of generative AI and digital attention across TikTok, Instagram, YouTube and a newsletter. She frames the project as "non-pretentious, non-patronizing" AI education and presents herself as a social media educator specializing in AI. By early 2025 her platforms had accumulated more than 400,000 followers and over 24 million views within six months. Goetze's work under the CatGPT banner includes commentary on how AI tools affect learning, critical thinking and motivation, and she has argued that generative AI can both undermine and revive deep learning depending on how it is integrated into study and teaching. Goetze was celebrated as a Creator of the Year at the 2025 Shorty Awards.

== Projects ==
=== Physical Phones ===
Goetze's Physical Phones project grew out of personal experiments in creating a physical boundary around smartphone use. Several years before launching the business she modified an old rotary telephone with Bluetooth components so that it functioned as a stationary handset connected to her mobile phone, allowing her to make and receive calls on a desk phone-style device while keeping most notifications out of sight. In 2025 she founded Physical Phones to manufacture and sell retro-style Bluetooth desk phones modeled on her own setup. The devices are designed to let users dock their smartphones out of reach while handling calls on a separate handset, with features such as dialing through the rotary phone and triggering a voice assistant by pressing a special key sequence. Goetze has described the project as a way to help people maintain the benefits of modern smartphones while regaining a sense of intentionality and balance around their use.

== Personal life ==
Goetze is based in California.
