= ILD Teleservices =

- Type: Private
- Industry: Telecommunications
- Founded: Delaware, United States (1996)
- Headquarters: Ponte Vedra Beach, FL, United States
- Products: LEC Billing; Bill to Phone; Direct Billing; Alternative Payment; Risk Management
- Revenue: US$ 100 million
- Number of employees: ▲350 (2007)
- Parent: ILD Corp
- Website: www.ildteleservices.com

ILD Teleservices, (a division of ILD Corporate) is a clearing house for LEC billing and alternative payment options, such as e-checks, ACH and micro payments. ILD performs payment processing services for communications companies, digital content providers, and other online vendors in North America. Founded in 1996, the company is headquartered in Ponte Vedra, Florida. In recent years, the company has been the subject of many consumer complaints as well as legal action brought by at least two states and the Federal Trade Commission. In 2003, ILD settled with the Federal Trade Commission.

== Description ==
ILD Teleservices is a leading payment processor for transactions between merchants and consumers. Through contractual relationships with telephone companies like AT&T and Verizon, ILD gives merchants the opportunity to let consumers charge products and services such as long distance, internet access, collect calling, and certain digital content directly to their phone bills.

Instead of purchasing these items with a credit card, disclosing banking accounts or financial information to the merchant, consumers can have a transaction billed directly to their phone. When they do, the merchant sends the buyer's transaction information to ILD, and ILD adds the charge to their phone bill. It is a service very similar to what credit card companies provide.

A visual map on the company's website illustrates the role ILD plays in payment processing. ILD Teleservices has partnered with more than 200 merchants to offer bill to phone payment services, and its network includes more than 1,400 Local Exchange Carriers, including AT&T, Verizon, Qwest, Embarq and others. ILD Teleservices processes in excess of 120 million transactions per year, equating to approximately $.5 billion of third-party charges placed on telephone bills.

ILD Teleservices is a division of ILD Corp. , a privately owned and US-based outsourcing services company headquartered in Ponte Vedra Beach, Florida.

== Consumer protection ==
In recent years, ILD has accelerated efforts to protect consumers from unauthorized charges on their telephone bills. The company has launched several initiatives designed to strengthen the security protocols of its service offering and inform consumers on alternative payment methods and ways to avoid unauthorized billing. These include:

=== Coalition to Ensure Responsible Billing ===
In order to protect consumers from unauthorized, deceptive or ambiguous charges on their telephone bills, ILD has adopted the Coalition to Ensure Responsible Billing (CERB) Standards of Practice. CERB was created, as noted on its site, "in an effort to fight the proliferation of 'cramming' (the addition of charges to a telephone bill for products or services that a consumer did not knowingly authorize)."

=== Online Self Help Center ===
A central component of its comprehensive effort to educate consumers about its Bill to Phone alternative payment method, ILD Teleservices has established a Self Help Center on its site, an online customer service application which is the first of its kind online in the payment processing industry. The Self Help Center provides a path for consumers to initiate inquiries and resolve transaction issues fast and effectively. Several key questions help guide consumers toward resolution. Consumers can submit inquiries about unrecognized charges, verify credit requests, and find a fast track to cancelling services.

=== Consumer education blog ===
In conjunction with its Self-help Center, ILD has launched a blog on its website to keep merchants and consumers informed of its business activities. ILD has played an active role in leading the Bill to Phone industry with the establishment of guidelines for e-commerce transactions on a telephone bill. ILD's blog provides tips, alerts, and other information that helps merchants and consumers alike make more informed decisions, including ways to avoid cramming, advice from the FCC, and articles on what consumers can do to protect themselves against the threat of unauthorized transaction on their telephone bill. Though ILD processes over 120 million transactions each year for buyers and merchants—over a half of a billion dollars in purchases—only a small fraction result in disputes and chargebacks, much like credit cards. When there are disputes, ILD investigates these with its merchants and makes sure that credits are applied back to the phone bill, just like credit card company standards. ILD continually monitors complaint levels against the merchant who the bills through us, and if it finds a merchant in violation of ILD policies, it has and will terminate their billing agreement.

=== Validation and authentication services ===
As part of an ongoing effort to strengthen its Bill to Phone alternative payment offering, ILD Teleservices is rolling out new validation and authentication services, iValidateSM, to ensure security credentials are met before processing a consumer transaction. The new web-based validation system enables merchants to verify a billing telephone number (BTN) with the LECs to ensure it is "LEC billable" before accepting a Bill to Phone transaction. All merchants that accept Bill to Phone payment and process transactions with ILD, can validate real-time through its internet portal, which mitigates unauthorized transactions and reduces unbillables.

=== Merchant verification process ===
As a clearing house, ILD claims it must maintain stringent policies and procedures in the merchant screening process, which includes a comprehensive background search on the merchant customer, its officers and owners. The company website states ILD utilizes an independent third-party background investigator to re-examine the merchant customer, its officers, owners and business information, and then before accepting a merchant as a phone billing customer, the company collects data on the merchant's product and/ or service, the marketing and sales plan for the product and/ or service, and other pertinent company information, which is then reviewed with final approval provided by the Local Exchange Carriers. However, these efforts have not stopped cramming through ILD as evidenced by the continued complaints against them on sites such as consumeraffairs.com

== Fraud allegations and lawsuits ==
Numerous consumer complaints have been made against ILD Teleservices alleging that have passed along phony, inaccurate, or inflated charges or subscriptions to customers. Numerous complaints have also been made that they failed to allow customers to dispute phony charges and insisted that the customers must pay their bills, even after the customers had explained that the charges were fraudulent. The allegations are sometimes unfounded as issues are typically with the merchant providing services. In nearly all cases that ILD has been named in, since its inception in 1996, the cases have been dismissed without admission of liability or finding of wrongdoing by the company. However, note the following Connecticut case, where ILD was found liable and which is typical of complaints as recent as March 2011.

=== Connecticut ===
In November 2002, the Connecticut Department of Consumer Protection reached a settlement with ILD Teleservices on a lawsuit ILD Teleservices and 800 Connect over alleged violations of the Connecticut Unfair Trade Practices Act. 800 Connect allegedly failed to disclose charges for use of its 800 numbers (common missdials of popular free numbers) and used ILD as a clearing house for those fraudulent charges. Attorney General Richard Blumenthal stated: "Callers who pressed '1' were provided with the correct toll-free telephone number which they had misdialed but were not informed that they would be charged a fee for receiving the correct toll-free telephone number. However, those callers who did not press '1' and stayed on the line were informed that they would be charged a fee for receiving the correct toll-free telephone number." As a result of the settlement, ILD Teleservices was made to pay $50,000 in penalties, and was prohibited from charging customers "when ILD knows, or should know, that the vendor did not disclose charges to consumers or obtain authorization from them..." Upon conclusion of the Connecticut filing, ILD instituted provisions within its business application process with merchants and the company refined its internal monitoring procedures to prevent similar occurrences in the future. The Connecticut Attorney General's Office Press Release on the matter reads as follows:

State Reaches Settlement With 800 Connect, ILD Teleservices

November 19, 2002"

Attorney General Richard Blumenthal and Department of Consumer Protection Commissioner James T. Fleming today announced settlements with ILD Telecommunications, Inc. (ILD) and 800 Connect and its principal David Stein for alleged violations of the Connecticut Unfair Trade Practices Act (CUTPA).

800 Connect failed to disclose charges that it imposed on consumers who misdialed frequently used toll-free telephone numbers, causing consumers to be improperly billed thousands of dollars, through ILD.

'Instead of a pay-per-call service, 800 Connect ran a scam-per-call program by concealing charges to consumers,' Blumenthal said. 'Rather than correcting billing problems and disputes, ILD merely repeated 800 Connect's scripted responses, which caused consumers to pay improper charges. 800 Connect is defunct, but our message to other businesses is constant: Businesses must disclose charges clearly and conspicuously, and consumers should check charges on bills.'

'Whether it is a bill for pay-per-call, or any other questionable service or charge, I urge consumers to carefully review their telephone bills each month,' Fleming warns. 'If they find a charge for a service they never received, or that was not disclosed, and the company does not immediately remedy the problem, contact the Department of Consumer Protection. I am pleased that 17,000 Connecticut consumers will receive credits for these 800 Connect charges billed by ILD; consumers work too hard for their money to lose any portion of it to a phone scam.'

800 Connect purported to provide a 'service' to consumers who mis-dialed certain frequently dialed toll-free telephone numbers. When consumers misdialed, they would hear a recorded message indicating that if they were trying to reach a stated business, they could receive the correct toll-free telephone number by either pressing the '1' key or staying on the line, or hanging up and checking the number through directory assistance. Callers who pressed '1' were provided with the correct toll-free telephone number which they had misdialed but were not informed that they would be charged a fee for receiving the correct toll-free telephone number. However, those callers who did not press '1' and stayed on the line were informed that they would be charged a fee for receiving the correct toll-free telephone number.

ILD, which has billing contracts with telephone companies, including SNET and Verizon in Connecticut, billed on behalf of 800 Connect. Consumers who were charged for 800 Connect received a page in their telephone bill identifying both ILD and 800 Connect. When consumers called ILD to question the 800 Connect charges, ILD informed consumers that they had been charged for receiving a telephone number provided by 800 Connect, after a toll-free number was misdialed. ILD generally did not issue bill credits.

Approximately 17,000 consumers will receive credits, amounting to approximately $47,000, on their November or December SNET or Verizon telephone bills. ILD will pay $50,000 in penalties and other funds to the State of Connecticut. 800 Connect and David Stein will pay a total of $2,500 in civil penalties.

Also in the settlement, ILD is prohibited from:

Billing or collecting for 800 Connect;

Billing telephone subscribers on their local telephone service bill for audio entertainment or information provided through a toll-free telephone number, unless they have agreed to the fees;

Billing consumers on their local telephone service bills for any vendor's telephone-billed purchase, when ILD knows, or should know, that the vendor did not disclose charges to consumers or obtain authorization from them in accordance with applicable law; and

Misrepresenting that a consumer who calls is obligated to pay for a charge or misrepresenting that the consumer authorized the charge.

Also, as provided in the settlement with 800 Connect and Stein, they are prohibited from soliciting Connecticut consumers to purchase any pay-per-call services, such as 900-number services or other audio information or any telephone-billed purchase, or from offering pay-per-call or audio services to Connecticut consumers for five years."

=== Wisconsin ===
In December 2007 the Wisconsin Attorney General's office announced that it had reached a settlement in its consumer protection lawsuit against ILD Teleservices. Attorney General Peg Lautenschlager claimed that over 1,000 customers were subscribed to monthly services that they did not order from the "eChurch Network" and "ILab". (Such as Internet access for people who did not even own computers.) These charges were billed through ILD Teleservices. The Attorney General alleged that ILD Teleservices is liable for violations of Wisconsin telecommunications law because they knew or should have known that the charges were fraud because according to ILD's own records, over 30% of the ILabs charges and over 40% of the eChurch charges were disputed. In accordance with the terms of the settlement, ILD Teleservices acted to control the refund of money to anyone who had made a complaint against the two merchants processing charges through ILD Teleservices; "eChurch Network" and "ILab", "terminate a merchant as a client if cramming complaints exceed 1% for three months in any six-month period", and to submit to various other monitoring processes. ILD has since refined its procedures to prevent similar occurrences in the future.

=== Federal Trade Commission ===
In February 2003, ILD Teleservices was required to pay a $675,000 fine to the FTC for violations of the FTC Act, which requires merchants providing Pay Per Call services, in this case, 800Connect, to maintain pre-subscription agreements for services provided via toll-free number. The Federal Trade Commission claimed that ILD Teleservices, in connection with the billing or collection of 800 Connect services, failed to abide by the dispute resolution procedures required by the "Pay Per Call" rule, which is a technical violation of the rule. The FTC alleged that ILD Teleservices further violated the rule for not recognizing that charging customers for a 1-800 call constitutes a billing error that must be forgiven, in fact, refunding money for less than half of the customers who complained (refunds they were legally obligated to give), thus "repeatedly and routinely violating the Rule". Finally, the FTC alleged that ILD Teleservices deceptively misrepresented to customers that they were required by law to pay for charges incurred by calling 1-800 number when, in fact, they were not required to pay those charges. Upon conclusion of the FTC filing, ILD instituted provisions within its contracts with merchants and refined its internal monitoring procedures to prevent similar occurrences in the future.

== Location ==
ILD maintains locations across the United States. The company operates network facilities and inbound call centers in Dallas, San Antonio, Atlanta, Jacksonville and Fort Lauderdale with corporate headquarters in Ponte Vedra Beach, Florida.
