= TBR21 =

TBR21 is a European telecommunications standard published by ETSI, and is the standard to which all telephone equipment must adhere to, to be allowed connection to Europe's public switched telephone network.

It is somewhat equivalent to the US part 68 standard.

TBR-21 has been replaced by the new ETSI standard ES 203-021

The "advisory notes" (ATAAB notes) are no longer being maintained.
