= IRoam =

Canadian mobile roaming provider

iRoam
- Formerly: Brightroam
- Type: Subsidiary
- Industry: Telecommunications
- Founded: 2006
- Defunct: 2022
- Fate: Acquired and brand retired
- Successor: Telehop
- Headquarters: Toronto, Canada
- Area served: US and Canada
- Products: Prepaid SIM cards, roaming plans, Mobile Phones, Cellular Roaming Plans
- Owner: iRoam Mobile Solutions, Telehop
- Website: iroam.com at the Wayback Machine (archived March 7, 2022)

iRoam formerly Brightroam was a Canadian mobile roaming provider. The company provided global cellular communications and prepaid SIM cards to corporations and individuals that provided reduced rates for international roaming.

To reduce costs customer service was minimal and automated. The company was headquartered in Toronto, Ontario, Canada. The company was acquired by another Canadian telecommunications company Telehop in 2014. The IRoam service continued as a brand of Telehop until 2022.

== History ==
=== Foundation ===
Founded in 2006, Brightroam Inc began as a subsidiary of Roadpost inc, leveraging their 15 years of history in providing short term cellular and international roaming services. The goal of the company was to provide international roaming services to North Americans, both to undercut roaming rates for GSM subs and to provide services to CDMA subscribers.

=== iRoam Mobile takeover ===
On December 22, 2010, BrightRoam was purchased by iRoam Mobile Solutions Inc. iRoam Mobile Solutions purchased Brightroam to complement its connectivity and security products and services for the mobile and roaming user, including iPass Inc., mobile device management and existing enterprise cellular roaming solutions.

With this purchase, iRoam assumed responsibility for all Brightroam customers, including maintaining 24/7 customer service, SIM cards delivery, activation as well as the user portal to allow users to manage their accounts.

=== Telehop merger ===
In May 2014, Telehop Communications Inc. acquired the business assets of iRoam Mobile Solutions Inc., a Canadian company that operates under the iRoam and Brightroam brands in North America. In line with the acquisition, G3 Telecom's G3 Wireless and Brightroam would form part of iRoam's consumer branding. The brand was discontinued in 2022.
