= WAP billing =

Mechanism

WAP billing is a mechanism for consumers to buy content from Wireless Application Protocol (WAP) sites that is charged directly to their mobile phone bill. It is an alternative payment mechanism to debit or credit cards and premium SMS for billing. Using WAP billing, consumers can buy mobile content without registering for a service or entering a username or password. The user clicks on a link and agrees to make a purchase, after which they can download content.

WAP billing is particularly associated with downloading mobile entertainment content like ringtones, mobile games and wallpapers. Some commentators have suggested it could compete with Premium SMS as a leading payment channel for mobile content.

== How WAP billing works ==
WAP billing works with WAP-enabled mobile phones over a GPRS or 3G wireless connection. The customer initiates a WAP session with the content service provider by browsing a WAP page, for example. The WAP site hoster obtains the visitor's MSISDN without the visitor having to register on a specific WAP gateway or service. This information is provided through integration with the operator's own MSISDN lookup service.

Consumers confirm a purchase by clicking on a 'confirm purchase' link on their mobile phone and the WAP billing platform informs the WAP application of the completed purchase transaction. Consumers are redirected to the content they have purchased. The purchases are recorded and billed directly via the mobile phone bill using the MSISDN.

== Cross-operator WAP billing ==
Attempts have been made to create a single, cross-operator WAP billing platform that can support the purchase of products on any mobile network.

In other markets, like Ireland, WAP Billing is available across O2 and Vodafone mobile operators, via MSIDSN forwarding. WAP billing is only available to mobile aggregators operating in the Irish market on a case by case, business model basis, unlike the UK market.

== Benefits of WAP billing ==
The benefits cited for WAP Billing include the ability to sell to minors who lack a credit card or bank account and an improved customer experience including 'Single click' purchases where transactions are completed without consumers having to send or receive a text message or remember shortcodes. It has been claimed that WAP Billing also reduces the possibility of fraud when paying for mobile content. Another benefit cited for WAP Billing is the assertion that users experience the same 'browse and buy' experience they are used to via their PC on the Internet.

== Critique of WAP billing ==
WAP billing lacks transparency to the customer. The act of signing a contract, handing out money to a human, reading, understanding and writing or at least typing something and thus also indirectly proving that you are a legitimate customer is reduced to a single touch. Even a child or a pet that occasionally touches the screen may trigger a purchase. Often a customer doesn't notice that they've actually paid for something or bought a subscription, until they look at their phone bill afterwards.

To silently start billing with a single click is very inviting for malicious apps and malicious embedded ads. This misuse of WAP billing is a form of clickjacking.

Once triggered it is hard to stop or cancel a payment. Normally there are three entities involved in the claim of the money:

- Your mobile provider,
- a payment gateway provider and finally
- the 3rd party provider that offers its paid service.

Thus, the service is indirectly paid through your phone bill. This makes it more complicated to deny the payment or to claim your money back.

In 2013, the Federal Trade Commission settled with Jesta Digital LLC concerning unauthorized WAP billing charges.

== See also ==
- LEC billing
