= Common Language Information Services =

Common Language Information Services encompasses several products that are in general use by the global telecommunications industry through license agreements. Common Language products combine numerics and mnemonics to establish naming conventions that telecommunication companies use to exchange critical information via Operations Support Systems and other interface mechanisms.

Common Language codes help communications companies name, locate, inventory and manage all aspects of their networks. They identify items as large as a building, as small as a single board in a digital switching machine and as complex as a customer circuit. TNS manages the registry for all Common Language codes on behalf of the telecommunication service providers industry.

Common Language code sets are recognized by industry standards bodies and organizations, including ATIS, ANSI, IETF, and ETSI.

== Common Language Codes ==
Common Language codes are distinguished for several specific applications:

=== CLEI codes ===
Common Language Equipment Identifier or CLEI code is an industry standard, globally unique identifier for telecommunications equipment with a uniform feature-oriented classification. CLEI codes may be acquired by telecommunications equipment manufacturers and assigned to devices before they are sold to a licensed service provider.

=== CLLI codes ===
Common Language Location Identification (CLLI) identifies buildings that contain telecommunication equipment, network facilities housed in those buildings and non-building sites such as poles and manholes. By labeling the equipment functionality, office number, city, and state in a CLLI code, a telecommunication company's central office can keep this information on and immediately reference any particular item when necessary. This information can be used for making repairs, replacing old equipment, ordering phone service, recovering call detail records, and assisting in tracing calls.

=== CLCI S/S ===
Special Service Circuit or CLCI S/S codes provide a coded designation for a service that is dedicated and billed to a particular customer.

=== CLCI MSG ===
Message Trunk Circuit or CLCI MSG codes provide a naming scheme for message trunk circuits. These codes identify individual trunks and trunk groups by number, office class, traffic use, trunk type modifier, signaling, and the originating and terminating office locations.

=== CLFI ===
Common Language Facility Identification or CLFI Codes provide a standard, mnemonic naming scheme to uniquely identify cable and transmission facilities between two standardized equipment nodes (identified via CLEI codes) within a network. It comprises facility designation, facility type, channel/pair/time slot, location of facility terminal A and location of facility terminal Z.

=== NC/NCI ===
Network Channel/Network Channel Interface or NC/NCI codes are used to communicate technical attributes of services, facilities and their associated interfaces to support interconnections between telecommunications service providers through the use of the Access Service Request (ASR) process.

=== Service order process ===
The service order process utilizes the USOC, USO and Field Identifiers (FIDs), to provision, bill and maintain services and equipment. Universal Service Order or USO Codes are used by telecommunications service providers to collect and structure all the information needed for service activation, including ordering, provisioning, service assurance and billing. USOC codes, also known as rate elements, are used by telecommunications service providers to identify each billable element of a customer's service. Field Identifiers or FIDs are used by telecommunications service providers to identify a billing preference or attribute of a customer's account. FIDs define the technical parameters required to provision and bill a customer's service beyond those described in USOCs.

=== General Codes ===
General Codes provide a naming scheme that applies across the industry to identify company names, equipment frames, service centers, design routes, signaling types, circuit switch originating equipment, distributing frame cross-connect points and standard abbreviations.

== See also ==
- Circuit ID
