= ICREACH =

Electronic surveillance program

ICREACH is an alleged top-secret surveillance-related search engine created by the United States National Security Agency (NSA) after the September 11 attacks.

The existence of ICREACH became public through the Snowden disclosures.

Classified documents published by news site The Intercept state that ICREACH is accessible to 23 government agencies, including the Federal Bureau of Investigation, Drug Enforcement Administration, and the Central Intelligence Agency, and was designed to store more than 850 billion records about phone calls, emails, cellphone locations, and text messages.

According to Ryan Gallagher, the reporter for The Intercept who revealed the ICREACH program, the data accessed through the system is "swept up and stored on this database en masse using this Reagan-era presidential order, which is called Executive Order 12333. And this thing is subject to no court oversight from the secret foreign intelligence court and minimal congressional scrutiny."

The search engine evolved from two other government tools available for various government agencies, CRISSCROSS and PROTON, the latter with more uses than the former, including viewing the latitude and longitude of phones and headers of emails, while CRISSCROSS was only usable for information on phone calls and could not view the location of the phone.
