= Dedicated line =

In computer networks and telecommunications, a dedicated line is a communications cable or other facility dedicated to a specific application, in contrast with a shared resource such as the telephone network or the Internet. It is a communication path between two points.

In practice, such services may not be provided by a single, discrete, end-to-end cable, but they do provide guarantees of constant bandwidth availability and near-constant latency, properties that cannot be guaranteed for more public systems. Such properties add a considerable premium to the price charged.

As more general-purpose systems have improved, dedicated lines have been steadily replaced by intranets and the public Internet, but they are still useful for time-critical, high-bandwidth applications such as video transmission.

Some institutions such as NPR and other news agencies have large numbers of private lines with people that they frequently interview, (often government agencies) though these are being phased out in favor of VoIP systems.

== See also ==
- Asynchronous Transfer Mode
- Frame Relay
- T-carrier
- E-carrier
- Hotline
- Leased line
- Private line
- Ringdown
- Resource reservation protocol
