= LEC billing =

Billing for Internet-based or other usually electronic services

LEC billing is a form of billing for Internet-based or other usually electronic services where the user is charged through their account with the local telephone company (also known as the local exchange carrier or LEC), rather than directly from the provider of the service.

LEC billing is permitted in the United States as the breakup of the Bell System forced local telcos out of the long-distance business; each client would otherwise receive multiple monthly bills (one for local service, one for long distance). There is no LEC billing for alternate long-distance carriers in Canada as Bell Canada and Telus remain in the long-distance business and do not collect on behalf of their competitors.

The LEC billing system is subject to abuse by vendors. Cramming is a form of phone fraud in which a third-party vendor adds unauthorised charges to a subscriber's local telephone bill.

== See also ==
- Cramming
- ILD Teleservices
- WAP billing
