= Tie line (telephony) =

Telecomms circuit between exchanges

A tie line, also known as a tie trunk, is a telecommunication circuit between two telephone exchanges or two extensions of a private telephone system.

== See also ==
- Private branch exchange
- Circuit ID
- Leased line
- Private line
