= Private line =

In telecommunications, a private line is typically a telephone company service that uses a dedicated, usually unswitched point-to-point circuit, but it may involve private switching arrangements, or predefined transmission physical or virtual paths. Most private lines connect only two locations, but some have multiple drop points. If the circuit is used for interconnecting switching systems, including manual switchboards, it is often called a tie line.

Among subscribers to the public switched telephone network, the term private line is often erroneously used to describe an individual telephone line for service for only one subscriber, as opposed to a party line with multiple stations connected.

In radio or wireless telephony, Private Line is a term trademarked by Motorola to describe an implementation of a Continuous Tone-Coded Squelch System (CTCSS), a method of using low-frequency subaudible tones to share a single radio channel among multiple users. Each user group would use a different low frequency tone. Motorola's trade name, especially the abbreviation PL, has become a genericized trademark for the method. General Electric used the term Channel Guard to describe the same system and other manufacturers used other terms.

A later digital version of a private line is called digital private line (DPL).

Advantages of private telephone lines are:

- High security as one dedicated link is provided
- Always available
- Instant data transmission

== Types ==
- PLNA - Private Line No Apparatus
- PLNE - Private Line No Equipment
- PLAR - Private Line Automatic Ringdown (think the "Red Phone")

== See also ==
- Leased line
- Dedicated line
- Party line
- Lec billing
- Interexchange carrier
