= G3 Telecom =

Communications company in Canada

- Industry: Telecommunications
- Founded: 1999
- Area served: Canada; United States
- Products: Long Distance; VoIP Home Phone; International Roaming
- Website: G3 Telecom Official Web Page

G3 Telecom is a telecommunications company based in Toronto. Established in 1999, it is a facilities-based telecommunications reseller registered with the Canadian Radio-television and Telecommunications Commission and U.S. Federal Communications Commission and serves customers in both countries with over 3 million calls processed monthly. It offers long distance, Voice over IP (VoIP) home phone, and an alternative international roaming service which is being offered under the sub-brand G3 Wireless. G3 Telecom is registered with the Better Business Bureau where it currently maintains an A+ rating.

In 2011, the company launched the SmartDialer app for Android, iOS and BlackBerry. Their free mobile app allows users to access G3's discount long distance rates directly from their mobile device's contact list.

The company introduced G3 Wireless in 2012, a North American and global wireless roaming service that is fully enabled for voice, SMS and data connectivity. The main product that they sell is the Global SIM Starter Pack. This retails for $29.95 and includes $10 of free airtime with free incoming text messages and free shipping.

== Mergers and Strategic Partnerships ==
G3 Telecom entered into an agreement with Telehop to sell its business services unit (PBX) in April 2013.

In December 2013, Telehop Communications Inc. (TSX-V: HOP) announced its expansion into Wireless Services by signing a Letter of Intent to acquire G3 Telecom’s businesses in the United States and the Philippines, as well as wireless telecommunications licenses for Huntsville, Dawson Creek, British Columbia and Ontario. Mr. Rajan Arora, the CEO of G3, will join the board of Telehop on completion of the acquisition.

In May 2014, Telehop Communications Inc. acquired the business assets of iRoam Mobile Solutions Inc., a Canadian company that operates under the iRoam and Brightroam brands in North America. The company provides global cellular phone communications services, SIM cards, roaming devices and worldwide Wi-Fi roaming solutions that are sold directly and through distributors for use around the world. In line with the acquisition, G3 Wireless and Brightroam will form part of iRoam's consumer branding.

== Products and services ==
=== Long Distance ===
G3's long-distance retail offerings cover access dial, direct dial, calling cards, and 1010 dial around service under the brand 10-10-ALO (ALO Telecom). Alternatively, they provide origination, termination and re-billing services to their wholesale clients.

=== VoIP - Voice over Internet Protocol ===
G3 operates a carrier grade Class 5 local switch and offers full VoIP telephone services to residential and business users. The company offers a fully featured home phone line with voice mail, call forwarding, call waiting, caller ID, and other features.

=== Cellular roaming ===
The G3 SIM card is a roaming SIM that comes with a US or Canadian phone number and in convertible standard/micro and nanoSIM forms that can be used with unlocked GSM mobile phones.

== Alliances ==
G3 Telecom has partnered with network providers such as 02 (Telefónica Europe), T-Mobile, Vodafone, Orange S.A., Digicel, and Movistar.
