= Cramming (fraud) =

Fraud using uninformed small charges

Cramming is a form of fraud in which small charges are added to a bill for service(s) or product(s) by a third party without the subscriber's consent, approval, authorization or disclosure. These may be disguised as a tax, some other common fee or a bogus service, and may be several dollars or even just a few cents. The crammer's intent is that the subscriber will overlook and ultimately pay these small charges without challenging their legitimacy or inquiring further.

According to the U.S. National Association of Attorneys General, cramming was the 4th most common consumer complaint of 2007 in the United States.

== Types ==
There are various forms of cramming.

=== Phone cramming ===
Phone cramming is the practice of placing unauthorized charges on a telecommunication subscriber's home or mobile telephone bill.

Cramming is most common in the US, where the breakup of the Bell System left subscribers with different vendors for local and long-distance service. LEC billing consolidated charges from multiple vendors on one bill, but opened an opportunity (which does not exist elsewhere) for fraudulent vendors to add their own charges to the consolidated bills. This is not the same as telephone slamming, where an existing vendor is replaced with a rival without the client's informed consent.

In the UK all the UK mobile operators have a third party direct to bill scheme (chargetomobile 'payforit') controlled by the Payforit Scheme Rules which prevent unauthorised charging.

In the USA an effort to prevent instances of cramming, some members of the third party billing industry have implemented screening and monitoring measures to identify and eliminate crammers. Some companies offer consumer protection websites to help consumers better understand their phone bill and detect cramming as soon as it occurs.

The Federal Communications Commission (FCC) estimates that cramming has impacted tens of millions of American households.

=== Web cramming ===
Web cramming involves billing consumers for a web page they did not even know they had.

This is most often accomplished when criminals develop new web pages for small businesses and non-profit groups for little or no expense. While advertising their service as free, these criminals actually engage in unauthorized phone charges on their victim's accounts. The most common scam involves "rebate checks." These checks, when cashed, transfer the customer's Internet service provider, placing monthly service charges on their telephone bill. This is made possible because telecommunications companies provide the service of being able to collect bills for companies that perform a service over the telephone.

=== Preacquired accounts ===
Another is "preacquired account telemarketing fraud", cramming of unauthorized charges by telemarketers who have bought or obtained consumer account information prior to the telemarketing call, sometimes from the consumer's own bank.

== Fighting cramming ==
Phone companies like Verizon respond by removing cramming charges from a consumer's bill upon request, and will cease business with the company that crams. Verizon, at the customer's request, will put a Cramming Block on the customer's account, that prevents third parties from adding charges.

All the UK mobile operators have a third-party direct-to-bill scheme (chargetomobile 'payforit') controlled by the Payforit Scheme Rules which prevent unauthorised charges.

== Notable cases ==
In 2005, Gambino Family Soldier Richard Martino and Captain Salvatore LoCascio admitted to running a cramming operation.

Following a Federal Communications Commission investigation, in October 2010, Verizon announced that it would refund up to $50 million to its customers to offset cramming charges.

In October 2014, AT&T Mobility agreed to pay $105 million in refunds and penalties for cramming for premium-rated short messages; the agreement was the largest such settlement in history; AT&T was "accused of keeping at least 35% of the fees, as well as obscuring the charges on bills and preventing customers from securing full refunds."

In May 2015, Verizon Wireless and Sprint agreed to pay $90 million and $68 million respectively to settle FCC investigations into cramming through unauthorized premium text messaging services. The Consumer Financial Protection Bureau and state attorneys general also took part in negotiating the settlements. According to the FCC, these cases brought the total penalties and restitution secured against the four largest U.S. wireless carriers to $353 million.

In December 2014, T-Mobile agreed to pay at least $90 million, including full refunds to affected customers, to settle a Federal Trade Commission lawsuit over mobile cramming. The settlement also required the company to obtain customers' express informed consent before adding third-party charges to their bills.

== See also ==
- Mail and wire fraud
