= Ryan Gallagher =

Scottish investigative journalist

- Born: Ryan Gallagher; Edinburgh, Scotland, UK
- Education: University of Edinburgh (MSc); University of Abertay, Dundee (BA)
- Occupation: Journalist
- Website: rjgallagher.co.uk

Ryan Gallagher is a Scottish investigative journalist. He writes about security and civil liberties for Bloomberg News, and previously worked for The Intercept reporting on classified documents leaked by former National Security Agency contractor Edward Snowden. He has previously worked for The Intercept, The Guardian, Slate, and the Financial Times.

In August 2014, Gallagher revealed the existence of ICREACH, an NSA search engine that he alleged is "the largest system for internally sharing secret surveillance records in the United States." In March 2014, with Glenn Greenwald, he revealed a joint NSA and British Government Communications Headquarters program to infect millions of computers with malware, a report that prompted Facebook founder Mark Zuckerberg to personally call U.S. President Barack Obama to complain.

In 2013, Gallagher was threatened by a private security contractor while working on a story exposing the use of facial recognition technology at the Statue of Liberty in New York.

He is listed on the New America Foundation's website as a Future Tense Fellow under a program that seeks "to bring exceptionally promising new voices and ideas into the nation's public discourse."
