= Common Language Location Identification =

Location identification system in North American telecommunications

Common Language Location Identification (CLLI) is an application of Common Language Information Services in the North American telecommunications industry. It specifies the location and function of telecommunication equipment or of a relevant location such as an international border or a supporting equipment location, such as a manhole or pole. CLLI was developed in the 1960s in the Bell System, and continued use after divestiture in the North American market under management by Bellcore, later renamed to Telcordia, then Iconectiv, which claims trademarks on the names "Common Language" and "CLLI", and now TNS.

CLLI codes are useful to telecommunications companies for ordering telephone service, for the rating of call detail records for billing purposes, and to assist in tracing calls. CLLI codes are associated with Vertical and Horizontal coordinates (frequently abbreviated to "V and H coordinates"), which were developed by AT&T researcher Jay K. Donald to provide a relatively simple method of calculating distance between two network locations. Various mileage-sensitive services are priced according to the V and H coordinates associated with the two endpoints' CLLI codes.

== Structure ==
The first six characters of a CLLI code represent the place the code refers to and contain two code elements:

- Four characters to denote the geographical area and the geographical area type (for example, city, town, and borough), known as the Geographical code element.
- Two characters to denote the state, province, or country, known as the Geopolitical code element. The codes HS (high seas) and EO (earth orbit) are reserved for ships at sea and satellites, respectively.

For the various code formats, the remaining two or five characters contain one of:

- A two-character building identifier, either two letters or two numbers, for telephone company buildings. Incumbent independent telephone companies will use two-letter identifiers with X as the first letter.
  - The two-character building identifier may be followed by three characters to identify an individual switching or non-switching entity within the building.
- A non-building location, identified by a letter followed by four digits.
- A client site is identified by a digit, a letter, then three more digits for non-building locations.

There are four CLLI code formats.

=== Network site code format ===
A Network Site code represents any existing or proposed building, structure, or enclosure, where there is a need to uniquely identify one or more network functions. Network Site codes are typically used to identify building locations, such as central office buildings.

- The first six characters are the city (four letters) and province/state (two letters). Each territory is normally identified using its two-letter ISO 3166-2:CA or ISO 3166-2:US postal abbreviation suffix (with exceptions: Newfoundland and Labrador as NF, Québec as PQ and Nunavut written as VU).
- The seventh and eighth characters in this format are known as the Network Site code element and denote the specific location or building address. These will be either two letters or two numbers; a X followed by a letter identifies a local independent telephone company building.

=== Network entity code format ===
CLLI codes in the Network Entity format are the most commonly used CLLI codes. Network Entity codes are eleven-character codes used to describe the location and function of network equipment.

- The first eight characters are the city, province/state and network site location (see Network Site Code Format, above).
- The ninth, tenth and eleventh characters of a Network Entity code specify a particular type of equipment function at a Network Site location.
  - Three-letter entity codes often begin with two letters to identify combinations of switching equipment such as MG (crossbar exchange - marker group), SG (step-by-step exchange - step group), CG (electronic switching system - control group), DS (digital switch), CT (concentrator) or RS (remote switcher).
  - Non-switching entity codes may begin with A (administrative office space and computers), E (exchange switchroom), F (frame), K (software cross-connectable entity), M (maintenance group), P (test/service position), Q (radio tower), S (service centre), T (toll test) or W (miscellaneous), followed by anything except G (to avoid conflict with switches).
  - Reserved final (eleventh) characters include B ('board' - operator and switchboard positions including '0' and '4-1-1'), D (various termination entities, including mobile or CLEC exchanges, hosted Centrex, 9-1-1 dispatch, time/weather and pre-recorded announcements), T (tandem), I, O, U, W or Y (not used). The specific type of board or termination entity is specified by the tenth character.

=== Network support site code format ===
A Network Support Site code represents any non-building structures or outside plant equipment such as Wireless Access Points, International Boundary Crossing Points, End-Points, Fiber Nodes, Junctions, Manholes, Poles, Base Transceiver Station / Radio Equipment and Repeaters.

This format contains 6 characters representing location and a 5-character Network Support Site Code element.

- The first six characters are the city (four letters) and province/state (two letters)
- The seventh character is a letter. X identifies any independent telephone company location. The letter otherwise is the location type: B (international boundary crossing), E (end point or non-international boundary), J (junction), M (manhole), P (pole), Q (radio location), R (repeater), S (toll station) or U (other or utility (per Pete)).
- The eighth through eleventh characters contain a four-digit identifying number.

The code for a communications satellite is STLT (satellite) EO (earth orbit) Q (radio location) then a four-digit identifier.

=== Customer site code ===
A Customer Site code is used to uniquely identify customer locations. These locations are required to identify customers, circuit terminations, facilities, or equipment for each specific customer for facility provisioning or other requirements. This format contains 6 characters representing location and a 5-character Customer Site Code element.

- The first six characters are the city (four letters) and province/state (two letters)
- The seventh character is a number, followed by a letter, then three more numbers.

Entities within client-owned buildings (such as Centrex installations) are coded in the same format as telephone company buildings.

== Examples ==
HSTNTXMOCG0

- HSTN = Houston
- TX = Texas
- MO = The AT&T telephone exchange office at 4068 Bellaire Boulevard in West University Place, Texas—the office is known as the "Mohawk office"
- CG0 = The first (or perhaps only) electronic telephone switch at that location (in this instance, analog - now HSTNTXMODS0 as a digital switch)

This code shows two characteristics:

- Telephone companies often give names to their central offices. The names frequently relate to the name given to the exchanges served from that office in the days of two-letter, five-number dialing, where a telephone number might have been referred to as "MOhawk 3-1234". The numbers are now listed as all-figures, so (713) MOhawk x-xxxx becomes +1-713-66x-xxxx.
- The Geographical code field does not always align exactly with the city location. West University Place is an enclave of Houston, Texas.

PTLDOR12DS0

- PTLD = Portland
- OR = Oregon
- 12 = The Qwest (Centurylink/Lumen) "Atlantic office" at 2911 NE 24th Ave
- DS0 = The first (and perhaps only) digital telephone switch at that location. While some telcos use -CG suffixes for both computer-controlled analogue and full-digital electronic switching systems, -DS is always a fully digital switch.

Some telephone companies named their central offices, but did not reflect this name in the CLLI code, as in the above example with a numeric location code.

PTLEORTEDS0

- PTLE = Portland
- OR = Oregon
- TE = A specific address: 6038 NE 78th Court
- DS0 = The first (and perhaps only) digital telephone switch at that location

The item to note in the above example is that Portland is usually abbreviated as "PTLD", but because of the relatively small number of possible combinations available in the two-character location code, the city abbreviation must occasionally be modified for locations added later, usually by incrementing the fourth character in the code.

DLLSTXRNDS1

- DLLS = Dallas
- TX = Texas
- RN = The Richardson office
- DS1 = The second digital telephone switch at that location

Note that this location is actually in Richardson, Texas, not Dallas. Apparently, the organizational structure of Southwestern Bell Telephone at the time considered Richardson to be within its own Dallas organization, although the cities themselves have always been legally separate.

SWASONXTSG1

- SWAS = Swastika, a 1908 mining village on the Ontario Northland Railway at the edge of Kirkland Lake
- ON = Ontario
- XT = X indicated a nominally independent telephone company, in this instance Timmins-area Northern Telephone Ltd.
- SG1 = a Western Electric step-by-step exchange

NorthernTel's +1-705-642 exchange at 5 Cameron Avenue, Swastika was a throwback to a simpler era in which mechanical stepping switches rotated in response to dial pulses from rotary dial telephones. As a step-by-step exchange offers none of the calling features of an electronic or digital switch, these are becoming increasingly rare as mechanical switching equipment is displaced by electronics. This one held out a little longer than most as it was a small community in formerly independent telco territory, but was ultimately replaced by a digital remote station SWASONXTRSA controlled from Timmins TMNSONXTCG0.

OTWAON080MD

- OTWA = Ottawa
- ON = Ontario
- 08 = A Bell Canada co-location site on Iona Street in Ottawa
- 0 = Identifies a specific local exchange at the site (this one is Rogers Wireless)
- MD = A mobile phone exchange or competitor's point of interconnection (POI) to an incumbent landline network.

Rogers is not a landline incumbent but a rival mobile telephone carrier with a block of 220000 Ottawa numbers. The Iona Street office (OTWAON08) is a co-location facility which hosts a landline exchange (incumbent Bell Canada's OTWAON08 -CG0) and three rival mobile switches (-0MD is Rogers, -3MD is Telus, -AMD is Bell Mobility), one for each major wireless carrier.

Similar naming conventions apply for CLEC exchanges at a point of interconnection to incumbent carrier networks. The suffix -MD nominally refers to "miscellaneous other termination entities".

MALTON22CG1

- MALT = Malton
- ON = Ontario
- 22 = An individual switching station (3255 Derry Rd E, Mississauga) located midway between Toronto's city limits and the main airport
- CG1 = One of two electronic switches on the same site (both are actually digital Nortel DMS-100's)

The city of Mississauga is a sprawling half-million person suburb directly west of Toronto. It is in Peel Region and therefore in a different local interconnection region, a different area code (905 instead of 416) and different, multiple rate centres (Clarkson, Streetsville, Cooksville, Malton, Port Credit; Bell Canada has no named "Mississauga" exchange despite the city's incorporation in 1973).

This individual exchange, MALTON22CG1, serves multiple rate centres with different local calling areas for each. It is located 1800 metres west of the boundary between Toronto and Mississauga, serving a major international airport (in Mississauga) and that airport's hotel strip (directly across the town line, therefore in Toronto). Callers from Markham would be a local call to the hotels but long-distance to the airport itself, even though both destinations are served by the same physical Digital Multiplex System switch.

This CLLI code identifies a wire centre (the location of the switch) only. A similar exchange on the other side of the town line (such as TOROON29DS0, located 900 metres east of Toronto's western city limits at 40 Old Burnhamthorpe Road, Etobicoke and serving multiple rate centres) would be issued a Toronto CLLI to reflect the location of the switch itself, but follow the same pattern of a more restrictive calling area for individual subscribers outside city limits. Wire centre CLLI codes therefore do not suffice to identify a rate centre or V/H co-ordinates for toll billing; any +1-416 numbers are billed as if they were in downtown Toronto.

WFISON15RS0

- WFIS = Wolfe Island
- ON = Ontario
- 15 = The +1-613-385 exchange (in this instance, the only local exchange).
- RS0 = An automated remote switching centre (RSC).

This is an unattended, automated remote switch housed in a small, square windowless brick building on a side street in Marysville village. It serves about 1400 people on Wolfe and Simcoe Islands in the Thousand Islands.

A Remote Switching Centre (RSC) has limited capability. It can operate autonomously to connect calls within the same exchange, but otherwise relies entirely on control via a single uplink to a host office (in this case, mainland Digital Multiplex System exchange KGTNON08CG0).

An electronic or digital exchange in a small city surrounded by rural villages most often will act as an upstream host for multiple remote switching centres, one in each local village.
