= Trillium Digital Systems =

Trillium Digital Systems, Inc.
- Industry: Software
- Founded: 1988; 38 years ago in Los Angeles, California
- Founder: Jeff Lawrence; Larisa Chistyakov
- Defunct: 2000; 26 years ago
- Fate: Acquired by Intel

Trillium Digital Systems, Inc. developed and licensed standards-based communications source code software to telecommunications equipment manufacturers for the Wireless, broadband, Internet and telephone network infrastructure. Trillium was an early company to license source code. The Trillium Digital Systems business entity no longer exists, but the Trillium communications software is still developed and licensed. Trillium software is used in the network infrastructure as well as associated service platforms, clients and devices.

== Company history ==
=== Trillium ===
Trillium was founded in February 1988 in Los Angeles, California. The co-founders were Jeff Lawrence and Larisa Chistyakov. Giorgio Propersi joined in September 1989. The initial capitalization of Trillium when it was incorporated was $1,000. The name Trillium came about because of a mistake. Jeff and Larisa asked for company name suggestions from family and friends. Someone suggested a character named Trillian from the book Hitchhiker's Guide to the Galaxy by Douglas Adams. They thought the suggestion was supposed to be trillium, a flower in the lily family. They liked the sound and symbolism of the name Trillium so they used it.

Trillium was started as a consulting company. Its first consulting jobs were to develop communications software for bisynchronous, asynchronous and multiprotocol PAD products. Consulting continued through the end of 1990. While consulting, the co-founders decided there was an opportunity to develop and license portable source code software for communications protocols. Towards the end of 1990 Trillium became focused on developing its own products.

Source code is a symbolic language (e.g., the C programming language) which is run through a compiler to generate binary code which can run on a particular microprocessor. Communications systems have a variety of hardware and software architectures, use a variety of microprocessors and use a variety of software development environments. It wasn't technically possible to develop a single piece of binary code that could run on many different systems. Source code, if properly designed and supported, can provide a highly leverageable solution that can be integrated and used in many different systems. The proper way to test source code is to compile it for all possible environments it might run in and then run and test it in those environments. There were as many environments as there were pieces of communications equipment. That testing approach was difficult. To overcome this difficulty Trillium developed an operating system called the Multiprocessor Operating System (MOS) that could run under commercially available operating systems such as DOS, Windows, Solaris and Linux and provide a simulation and testing environment for its software products.

Trillium's first software product supported the X.25 communications protocol. Subsequent products were developed for a number of data communications and voice communications protocols. Trillium's primary focus in its early years was on control plane and signaling plane protocols. In later years Trillium also developed some data plane protocols. A more comprehensive list of the software products developed by Trillium is listed in the Product History section. Trillium is currently developing software products to support the Femtocell communications protocols. Throughout its history Trillium was also very active in standards-setting bodies including the CCITT/ITU, IETF, ATM Forum, Frame Relay Forum and others.

Trillium software products were used in communications and networking products designed for the PDN, PSTN, Internet, enterprise networks and home networks. Trillium's evolution and development paralleled the evolution and development of the communications industry. In 1988 there were less than 1/2 million Internet users, about 4 million cell phone users and no broadband (DSL, cable) users. The industry went through significant transitions from the mid-1980s through the early 2000s, as described in the market history section. By 2008 there were over 1.4 billion Internet users, almost 3.3 billion mobile phone users and over 1 billion broadband users.

During this period, communications equipment manufacturers licensed source code software to reduce their time to market, decrease their development risk and reduce their costs. By 1999 many companies offered source code software products. Some of these included:

Company	Location	Products
Trillium Digital Systems	US	SS7, ATM, IP, Interworking, High Availability, ISDN, Frame Relay, V5, X.25/X.75, Professional Services
ADC Newnet	US	SS7, High Availability, Professional Services
Data Connection Limited	England	ATM, IP, High Availability
Data Kinetics	England	SS7
DGM&S Telecommunications (SignalSoft)	US	SS7, Interworking, High Availability
DynamicSoft	US	IP
Ficon Technology	US	ATM, IP
Future Software	India	ATM
Harris & Jeffries (NetPlane)	US	ATM, High Availability
Hughes Software Systems	India	SS7, ATM, IP, Interworking, High Availability, Frame Relay, V5, Professional Services
Inverness	Israel	ATM
Omnitel	France	ISDN, V5
Radvision	Israel	IP
Tdsoft	Israel	V5
Telenetworks	US	ATM, Interworking, ISDN, Frame Relay, X.25/X.75
Telesoft International	US	SIP, ISDN, T1 RBS, CAS E1 R2, Frame Relay and Multi-Link Frame Relay, PPP and ML-PPP, X.25/X.75, interworking, white-label softphone, white-label VoIP-PSTN gateway, High-Availability, Professional Services

Trillium was funded entirely by its cash flow from its founding through 1999. In late 1998, Trillium decided that to provide liquidity for its shareholders and accelerate its growth it should raise money through an initial public offering. After discussions with investment bankers, it was decided that to improve its initial public offering valuation, it would be necessary to first raise some private equity money to fund organizational expansion, revenue growth and revenue rebalancing. In early 1999, Trillium entered discussions with various venture capital and private equity firms. It closed two private equity deals, one with Rader Reinfrank & Co. in July 1999 for $10 million and the other with Intel Capital and its Intel Communications Fund in September 1999 for $4 million. Rader Reinfrank & Co. was the lead investor and Intel Capital was a co-investor. Trillium used the funds to accelerate the growth of its organization and product line in preparation for a planned initial public offering in either 2000 or 2001. Trillium received ISO 9001 certification in February 2000 and SEI -CMM Level 2 certification in December 2001.

=== Trillium, an Intel Company ===
During 1999 and 2000, a number of Trillium's competitors either went public, or were acquired.

Company	Event		Valuation	Date
HotHaus	Acquired by public company	VoIP software	$280 million	March 1999
Telogy	Acquired by public company	VoIP software	$457 million	June 1999
Ficon Technology	Acquired by public company	IP, ATM software	$90 million	January 2000
RadVision	Initial public offering	IP software	Priced at $20.00 / share	March 2000
Inverness	Acquired by public company	IP and MPLS software	$115 million	March 2000
NetPlane (Harris & Jeffries)	Acquired by public company	IP, ATM, Frame Relay software	$140 million	July 2000
SignalSoft (DGM&S)	Initial public offering	SS7 software	Priced at $17.00 / share	August 2000
DynamicSoft	Acquired by public company	SIP software	$55 million	July 2004

In March 2000, following inquiries from potential acquirers, Trillium decided to explore its sale. Trillium created a list of potential acquirers that included communications equipment manufacturers, communications semiconductor companies and a few other companies. Intel Corporation was part of this list since they were already an investor in Trillium. Craig Barrett, the CEO of Intel, felt it was important for Intel to be involved in the communications and networking business. Starting in 1997, and over a 5-year period, Intel spent over $10 billion acquiring communications chip, hardware and software companies. Intel acquired Trillium in a deal for $300 million that closed on August 24, 2000. Intel's objectives in acquiring Trillium were to expand the networking software available to its network processor, establish a viable entry into the networking software business to complement the network processor business as they moved to sell platform level solutions, and validate and optimize software designs to address high growth communications market segments including voice over IP and Wireless.

As part of the closing, Intel certified there were no material adverse effects; any changes reasonably likely in the future to be materially adverse on the operations, assets, liabilities or earnings of Intel. On August 28, 2000, Intel stopped selling and recalled its Pentium III due to design defects and performance problems, on September 21, 2000, it issued an earnings warning and on September 28 it cancelled its Timna chip and delayed its Pentium 4 and Itanium chips due to design defects and performance problems. In just a little over a month (from August 24, 2000, to September 29, 2000) Intel stock plummeted from over $70 per share to $40 per share.

Trillium became a wholly owned subsidiary of Intel. It was renamed for external purposes as “Trillium, an Intel Company” and for internal purposes as the "Networking Software Division (NSD)". In 2002, NSD was renamed as the “Control Plane Processing Division (CPPD)”. The division was initially part of Intel's Network Communications Group, which later became the Intel Communications Group. Jeff Lawrence moved into Intel when the deal closed, and Larisa Chistyakov stayed with Trillium. The functional integration of Trillium into Intel was considered successful, but the strategic and value integration was considered less successful. After the deal closed Trillium continued to focus on offering its communications software products and professional services to external customers and also started to develop cross divisional and business group customers within Intel. Trillium focused significant resources on integrating its software products into Intel network processors and related products.

Jeff Lawrence left Intel in March and Larisa Chistyakov left Intel in September 2002. Larisa died on December 22, 2008.

=== Continuous Computing, Trillium Software ===
As the dot-com bubble burst in 2000 and 2001, Intel started selling many of its communications businesses. Continuous Computing, based in San Diego, California, acquired Trillium's intellectual property, customers and also hired some Trillium engineering, sales and marketing staff from Intel in February 2003.

Continuous Computing continued to license Trillium software, develop additional software Trillium software products and also bundle the software with its products. Trillium software products celebrated their 20th anniversary in 2008.

=== RadiSys, Trillium Software ===
RadiSys, which provides hardware and software for Internet-based telecommunications, announced on May 3, 2011, that it was going to acquire Continuous Computing and its Trillium software products in a deal valued at $120 million. RadiSys and Continuous Computing are focused on complementary areas of networking technology.

=== Reliance Jio ===
Reliance Jio, an Indian telecommunications carrier, announced in July 2018 that it was going to acquire Radisys for $1.72 per share, or $74 million in total. Reliance Jio is focused on 5G, IoT, and open-source architecture adoption.

== Market history ==
There were a number of regulatory, financial and technology events that drove the telecommunications industry, and subsequently drove Trillium's growth and development.

- General network infrastructure moved from time division multiplexing to statistical multiplexing and from character based communications to packet based communications.
- Work on the OSI reference model was initiated in 1977. The OSI reference model is an abstract description for layered communications and computer network protocol design.
- Telephone network infrastructure moved from In-band signalling to out-of-band signalling.
- Computing and communications moved from closed and proprietary mainframe based systems to open systems.
- Equipment manufacturers moved from in-house technology development to buying or licensing hardware and software technology from other technology providers.
- Different voice, data and video networking technologies converged.
- Equipment manufacturers moved from using proprietary software solutions to open source software solutions.
- The breakup of AT&T was initiated in 1974 by the U.S. Department of Justice antitrust suit against the telephone company's monopoly. In 1982, AT&T agreed to break itself up into several firms in 1984. The breakup of the AT&T's monopoly led to a surge of competition in the long-distance telecommunications market as new carriers came into existence. It also improved the ability of other companies to sell their equipment to the regional Bell operating companies.
- The first TCP/IP based wide area network became operational in 1983. The Internet was opened to commercial interests in 1988 and was initially used for e-mail, file transfer and other applications.
- The first release of the Mosaic Web browser was in late 1994.
- The stock market crashed in 1987. A recession followed, starting in mid-1990 and ending in 1991.
- Software bugs in the switching systems of the core network caused massive failures in the telephone networks of AT&T in 1990 and Bell Atlantic and Pacific Bell in 1991. These network crashes shutdown telephone service for large portions of the United States and prompted Congressional investigations into the reliability of the telephone network.
- The U.S. Federal Communications Commission (FCC) started competitive wireless spectrum auctions in 1994.
- The Telecommunications Act of 1996 was signed into law in early 1996. It deregulated portions of the telecommunications industry and led to a surge of competition in the local access, wireless and other markets. Other countries also started deregulating their telecommunications industries.
- The Asian financial crisis erupted in mid-1997 as poor fundamentals, structural weaknesses and a shift in investor sentiments caused liquidity problems in the financial systems of a number of Asian countries. The crisis stabilized by the beginning of 1999.
- The dot com bubble started growing in the mid to late 1990s and burst in 2000. The bubble was driven by a large increase in Internet access, large increase in wireless handset availability, and a belief that data intensive applications were going to drive the next generation network. The network was moving from being voice centric to data centric, from narrowband technologies to broadband technologies and from 2nd generation wireless to 3rd generation wireless technologies to accommodate real and perceived demand. Data bandwidth needs were doubling every 3–4 months. As the bubble burst, network operators, service providers, equipment manufacturers and others suffered huge losses. Over $2 trillion in market capitalization evaporated in less than 12 months and over 500,000 jobs were lost. Over 60 telecommunications carriers in the U.S. filed for bankruptcy between 2000 and 2002. By the end of 2000, it was difficult for companies to raise money through private equity funding or initial public offerings.

== Product technology ==
All Trillium products are based on the Trillium Advanced Portability Architecture (TAPA), a set of architectural and coding standards designed to ensure that the individual source code software products are portable and independent of the target system's compiler, processor, operating system and architecture. Each software product is provided as C source code and has four programming interfaces: the system services interface, the layer management interface, the upper interface and the lower interface. TAPA describes the parameters and expected behavior across each interface.

Individual Trillium software products consist of tens of thousands to hundreds of thousands of lines of source code. Each Trillium software product could be used separately, or in conjunction with other software products to build complete protocol stacks. Trillium software products were also able to support different national and industry variants of specific protocols. In later years, as the different network infrastructure technologies converged, Trillium software products were able to support interworking and translation between the different network infrastructure technologies (e.g. telephony to Internet Protocols). They were used in a wide range of network equipment, products and devices.

	Clients and devices	Infrastructure							Service platforms, servers, and storage
		Core	Access				Enterprise	Home	
			Narrowband	Broadband	Mobile wireless	Fixed wireless			
Type of network	Enterprise, home	Public	Public	Public	Public	Public	Private, enterprise	Home	Not applicable
Sub-type of network	Not applicable	Core transport, metro transport, access	Narrowband access, remote access, aggregation	Broadband access, aggregation	Wireless access, aggregation	Wireless access, aggregation	Enterprise, SOHO, VSO, LAN, SAN, key system, PBX, iPBX	Home, SOHO	Not applicable
Product solutions	Audio / screen / video IP phone, 2G / WAP / GPRS / 3G / 4G wireless handset, TV, DVR, PC, game console, tablet, PDA, laptop, consumer device, sensor	Core switch / router, edge switch / router, metro switch / router, multi service switch, media gateway controller / softswitch, optical cross connect, optical add/drop mux, signalling gateway, trunking media gateway, service node, service platform, test and monitoring, content switch, application / control / directory server, storage	Access switch, multi service switch, media gateway controller / softswitch, access gateway, residential gateway, remote access server, test and monitoring, cache server, storage	DSLAM, CMTS, multi service switch, media gateway controller / softswitch, access gateway, residential gateway, test and monitoring, content switch, cache server, storage	Base station controller, base transceiver station, radio network controller, node b, serving GPRS support node, gateway GPRS support node, location register, authentication center, equipment id register, media gateway controller/ softswitch, test and monitoring, content switch, cache server, storage	Base station, multi service switch, media gateway controller / softswitch, access gateway, residential gateway, test and monitoring, content switch, cache server, storage	Business gateway, integrated access device, router, network interface card, wireless LAN, firewall and intrusion detection, application server, web server, storage, workgroup switch / router, backbone switch / router, server switch, content switch, IP PBX, web server, media server, dbase server, storage, test and monitoring, mux, femtocell base station	Residential gateway, settop box, cable modem, DSL modem, router, network interface card, wireless LAN, femtocell base station	Service platform, service node, content / server switch, application / control / media / directory / security / dbase / web server, content processing, storage, media gateway controller / softswitch, location register, authentication center, equipment id register, position determining entity

== Product history ==
During its history, Trillium has developed over 150 software products, which parallel the evolution and development of the network infrastructure. These software products support communications protocols specified in international (e.g. ITU), national (e.g. ANSI) and industry (e.g. IETF) standards. These products are licensed primarily to telecommunications equipment manufacturers and include:

Technology	Description	Products	First customer ship
X.25, X.75	Connection oriented protocols to provide data communications over the packet switched wide area network (WAN).	X.25, X.75, LAPB	June 1990
ISDN	Protocols to manage and support integrated voice and data communications over a phone line. Uses a circuit-switched telephone network system, that also provides access to the packet switched wide area network (WAN).	Q.930/Q.931, LAPD	December 1990
Frame Relay	Protocols to manage and support data communications between local area networks (LANs) and end-points over a packet switched wide area network (WAN).	Q.933/LMI	November 1991
SS7, SIGTRAN	Telephony signaling protocols used to set up and tear down telephone calls on the public switched telephone network.	MTP 2, MTP 3, SCCP, TCAP, ISUP, MAP 3G, MAP IS-41, INAP, CAP, MTP 3B, Q.2140, DUA, IUA, M2PA, M2UA, M3UA, SCTP, SUA, V5UA	March 1992
ATM	Connection oriented protocols to manage and support the transmission of data, voice and video communications over cell based networks	AAL2 Signalling, Q.SAAL	November 1993
V5	Protocols to manage communications between the telephone exchange and the local loop.	Envelope Function, LAPV, Layer 3	February 1996
Interworking	Protocols to manage and support interworking, conversion and translation between different control and signalling protocols.	Protocol Specific Functions	April 1997
Fault tolerance, high availability	Software to manage and support load distribution across multiple processor configurations and/or fault tolerant active/standby processor configurations.	DFT/HA Core, Load Distribution Functions	June 1998
VoIP	Protocols to manage and support the transmission of voice through the Internet or other packet-switched networks.	H.323, SIP, MGCP, H.248/MEGACO, RTP/RTCP/SRTP	March 1999
Wireless	Protocols to manage and support the transmission of voice, data and video over wireless networks.	2G – MAP IS-41, SS7; 2.5G – BSSGP, CAP, GMM/SM, GTP, LLC, MAP 3G, NS, RLC/MAC SNDCP; 3G – ALCAP, CAP FP, GMM/SM, GTP, lu UP, MAC 3G, MAP 3G, NBAP, PDCP, RANAP, RLC 3G, RNSAP, RRC, SIGTRAN	March 1999
IMS	Protocols to manage and support the transmission of Internet Protocol (IP) multimedia to mobile users on wireless networks.	AAL5, COPS, Diameter, ISUP, MAP 3G, M3UA, MTP 2, MTP 3, MTP 3B, Q.2140, SCCOP, SCCP, SCTP, SIP, TCAP, TUCL	
Femtocell	Protocols to manage and support the transmission of voice, data and video over wireless networks using small residential or business base stations.	RRC, PDCP, RLC 3G, MAC 3G, MAC-hs, MAC-c, MAC-es, RANAP, SCCP, SUA, M3UA, SCTP, lu UP, GTP, lu-h, UMA Client, Diameter, GMM/SM, SIP, FP, NBAP, SCTP, TR-069	

Trillium software has been used in over 500 communications and networking products.

== Trillium poster ==
Trillium conceived of and published a poster that provided detailed technical information about the network infrastructure and protocols in an attractive format that was easy to understand. It became an indispensable tool for the communications industry, and was displayed on the office walls and conference rooms of tens of thousands of engineers, venture capitalists and financial analysts around the world. The poster is periodically updated to reflect changes in the network infrastructure and protocols. The 1st generation poster was published in 1997 and was inspired by the "ISO and CCITT Data Communication Standards" poster published by Retix. The 5th generation of the poster was published in 2008.
