= Global title =

Address used for routing SS7 messages

SS7 protocol suite
- SS7 protocols by OSI layer
- Application: INAP, MAP, IS-41... TCAP, CAP, ISUP, ...
- Network: MTP Level 3 + SCCP
- Data link: MTP Level 2
- Physical: MTP Level 1

A global title (GT) is an address used in the Signalling Connection Control Part (SCCP) protocol for routing signaling messages on telecommunications networks. In theory, a global title is a unique address which refers to only one destination, though in practice destinations can change over time.

== Overview ==
The global title is similar in purpose on the PSTN to the host name on the Internet. In design, however, global titles are quite different. The structure is usually hierarchical, the value can be of variable length, and is not necessarily a wholly numeric value—though it often is for issues of backward compatibility and association with regular telephone numbers.

== Structure of the global-title value ==
The structure of a global title for ITU-T applications is officially defined in ITU-T Recommendation Q.713, and further extended in the supporting numbering plan standards. Other national variants of SCCP, such as the American National Standards Institute variant specified in ANSI T1.112/2000, define their own format for the Global Title. The value of a global title is a sequence of attributes which modify the address value. To summarize:

=== Global title format ===
A global title can be in a variety of formats, most of which are each defined in separate standards. The format parameter indicates which of the available formats are in use. Each format can include any of the subsequent parameters.

=== Numbering plan indicator ===
The numbering plan indicator (NPI) describes which numbering plan will be used for the global title. The chosen numbering plan will aid the routing system in determining the correct network system to direct the message.

=== Type of number ===
The type of number (TON) or Nature of Address Indicator (NAI) parameter, which is of relevance to E.164 (regular telephone) numbers for example, indicates the scope of the address value, such as whether it is an international number (i.e. including the country code), a "national" or domestic number (i.e. without country code), and other formats such as "local" format (e.g. in the U.S., without an area code).

=== Translation type ===
The translation type (TT) parameter is used in a network to indicate the preferred method of global title analysis (see below). Normally in European networks, this parameter is set to 0 (the default) value. In North American mobile networks, different translation types are used for analysis of the IMSI and for messages between telephone systems. This parameter is valuable in complex routing problems, where the same number has to be routed differently depending on the circumstances, such as those introduced by number portability resolution.

== Global title translation ==
Global title translation (GTT) is the SS7 equivalent to IP routing. Translation examines the destination address (e.g. the number being called) and decides how to identify it over the telephone network. This process can include global title analysis, which is the act of looking up the number and finding a result address, and global title modification.

It is possible for the result of global title translation to be route on SSN. This means that, instead of the Global Title routing, lower level MTP routing will be used for this message from this point on. Equivalently, in a system using SS7 over IP (for example, SIGTRAN), the result from Global Title Translation may be to route to an IP server, though the exact details depend greatly on which variant of SS7 over IP is being used.

=== Global title analysis ===
The situation in this case is somewhat complicated by the additional parameters possible in the global title. Each set of parameter values (TT=0 NP=E.164, TON=INT) can be treated separately from each other one (TT=0 NP=E.214, TON=INT). This means that, instead of one single table, we potentially need a separate table for each possible set of values.

The variable length of the global title makes certain optimisations that can be used in IP routing not so easy to use here. The number analysis of a Global Title is most often done in a tree structure. This allows reasonably efficient analysis to any depth which is chosen.

In the end, global title analysis gives some result. The exact possibilities vary from system to system, is sometimes called an "action" or is integrated into the analysis table.

The destination would typically be given as a signalling point code in an MTP network, but could also be an IP system if we are using SS7 over IP.

=== Routing structure ===
The most commonly used numbering plans for global title routing are E.164 and E.214 (although E.212 is also common in America). These simply look like telephone numbers. That is to say, in the most common, international, variant there is a country code at the start of the number and a Network Code immediately following the country code. Beyond that is the subscriber number or mobile subscriber identity number, though even that may be divided into sections. This structure allows for the use of hierarchical routing:

- International SCCP gateways know which systems handle each of the other countries
- The international SCCP gateway belonging to each country knows which SCCP gateways handle each network
- The SCCP gateway of each network knows the network's own internal structure

In America, the limitations of the North American Numbering Plan mean that the destination country is not immediately obvious from the called party address. However, the fact that there is unified administration means that this can be overcome by having complete analysis at every point where it is needed.

== Global title routing in mobile networks ==
In mobile networks, there are database queries such as "how can I tell if this subscriber is really who he says he is" (MAP_Send_Authentication_Info) which have to be routed back to the database which holds the subscriber's information (the home location register [HLR], or in this case, the authentication center [AuC]).

When the subscriber first arrives the subscriber's HLR is unknown. For this reason, the queries have to be routed on the subscriber's identity (IMSI) which is used to generate the called party address in the message. How this is done depends on the location. There are three types of GT in use in mobile networks known as E.164 (MSISDN), E.212(IMSI) and E.214(MGT):

- E.164(MSISDN) = CC+NDC+SN - (Country code + National destination code + Subscriber number) e.g. 91-98-71405178
- E.212(IMSI) = MCC+MNC+MSIN - (Mobile country code + Mobile network code + Mobile subscription identification number) e.g. 404-68-6600620186 (MTNL delhi)
- E.214(MGT) = combination of E.212 and E.164(CC+NDC+MSIN) (Exact combination is defined in the operators IR21 document)

=== Mobile global title routing (except North America) ===
Everywhere in the world, except North America, the subscriber's IMSI is converted to a Mobile Global Title (MGT) E.214 number. See the entry about the IMSI for more details. The E.214 number has a structure which is similar to the E.164 number, and, except in a mobile network it can be routed identically. This means that the same routing tables can be used for both and means considerably reduced administrative overhead in maintaining the tables.

Once a signalling message with an E.214 number enters a mobile network in its own country, the routing is dependent on the operator of that mobile network. In networks without number portability, it is normal that the MSIN has a structure and that, by analysing the first few digits we can further route the message to the right element.

=== IMSI routing (North America) ===
In World Area 1 (corresponding to North America) ANSI SCCP is in use. In this case, due to North American standards, the routing of mobility related messages must be done with the E.212 number directly. This has the advantage that it is easier to identify to which country messages should be routed based on the mobile country code. The design of the North American Number Plan means that there is not a separate country code for each country in North America. Working with E.214 numbers would not be an insurmountable challenge, as can be seen from the fact that routing of phone calls using E.164 numbers is normal, but it would mean adding full E.164 routing tables to signalling transfer points where it has never been needed before.
