= M3UA =

SS7 protocol suite
- SS7 protocols by OSI layer
- Application: INAP, MAP, IS-41... TCAP, CAP, ISUP, ...
- Network: MTP Level 3 + SCCP
- Data link: MTP Level 2
- Physical: MTP Level 1

M3UA is a communication protocol of the SIGTRAN family, used in telephone networks to carry signaling over Internet Protocol (IP). M3UA enables the SS7 protocol's User Parts (e.g. ISUP, SCCP and TUP) to run over virtually any network technology breaking its limitation to telephony equipment like T-carrier, E-carrier or Asynchronous Transfer Mode (ATM), which highly improves scalability of the signaling networks.

M3UA stands for MTP Level 3 (MTP3) User Adaptation Layer as defined by the IETF SIGTRAN working group in RFC 4666 (which replaces and supersedes RFC 3332). Like other adaptation protocols, M3UA uses SCTP to transmit messages between its network elements.

== Implementation scheme ==
M3UA: Transmitting MTP-3 messages: on the left is the TDM-network for SS7. On the right is the IP network with SIGTRAN as a transport.

=== Typical scheme ===
________                   _________                __________ 
|      |                   |       |                |     MGC|
|  SP  |<----------------->|  SGW  |<---------------|-->(AS) |
|______|   SS7 network     |_______|   IP network   |________|
  MTP3
point-code                         common point-code
   PC1                                    PC2

=== Use SGW as STP ===
Several AS owns PC itself and uses SGW as STP (transit pointcode).

________                 _____________               ___________ 
|      |                 |    SGW    |               |      MGC|
|      |                 |           | /-------------|-->(AS)  | point-code PC3
|  SP  |<----------------|-->(STP)<--|-              |         |
|      |                 |           | \-------------|-->(AS)  | point-code PC4
|______|  SS7 network    |___________|   IP network  |_________|
  MTP3                    point-code
point-code                   PC2                         
   PC1

== Protocol ==
M3UA uses a complex state machine to manage and indicate states it's running. Several M3UA messages are mandatory to make an M3UA association or peering fully functional (ASP UP, ASP UP Acknowledge, ASP Active, ASP Active Acknowledge), some others are recommended (Notify, Destination Audits (DAUD)).

== Additional info ==
An open implementation of the M3UA standard can be found at OpenSS7's web site.

Wireshark is shipped with a dissector for M3UA, sample packets can be found in Wireshark's wiki page, which shows ISUP Packet samples (including M3UA).
