= List of network protocols (OSI model) =

This article lists protocols, categorized by the nearest, layer in the Open Systems Interconnection model. This list is not exclusive to only the OSI protocol family. Many of these protocols are originally based on the Internet Protocol Suite (TCP/IP) and other models and they often do not fit neatly into OSI layers.

== Layer 1 (physical layer) ==
- Telephone network modems
- IrDA physical layer
- USB physical layer
- EIA RS-232, EIA-422, EIA-423, RS-449, RS-485
- Ethernet physical layer 10BASE-T, 10BASE2, 10BASE5, 100BASE-TX, 100BASE-FX, 1000BASE-T, 1000BASE-SX and other varieties
- Varieties of 802.11 Wi-Fi physical layers
- DSL
- ISDN
- T1 and other T-carrier links, and E1 and other E-carrier links
- ITU Recommendations: see ITU-T
- IEEE 1394 interfaces
- TransferJet
- Etherloop
- ARINC 818 Avionics Digital Video Bus
- G.hn/G.9960 physical layer
- CAN bus (controller area network) physical layer
- Mobile Industry Processor Interface physical layer
- Frame Relay
- FO Fiber optics
- X.25

== Layer 2 (data link layer) ==
- ARCnet Attached Resource Computer NETwork
- ARP Address Resolution Protocol
- ATM Asynchronous Transfer Mode
- CHAP Challenge Handshake Authentication Protocol
- CDP Cisco Discovery Protocol
- DCAP Data Link Switching Client Access Protocol
- Distributed Multi-Link Trunking
- Distributed Split Multi-Link Trunking
- DTP Dynamic Trunking Protocol
- Econet
- Ethernet
- FDDI Fiber Distributed Data Interface
- Frame Relay
- ITU-T G.hn
- HDLC High-Level Data Link Control
- IEEE 802.11 WiFi
- IEEE 802.15.4 Low-rate wireless personal area network
- IEEE 802.16 WiMAX
- LACP Link Aggregation Control Protocol
- LattisNet
- LocalTalk
- L2F Layer 2 Forwarding Protocol
- L2TP Layer 2 Tunneling Protocol
- LLDP Link Layer Discovery Protocol
- LLDP-MED Link Layer Discovery Protocol - Media Endpoint Discovery
- MAC Media Access Control
- Q.710 Simplified Message Transfer Part
- Multi-link trunking Protocol
- NDP Neighbor Discovery Protocol
- PAgP - Cisco Systems proprietary link aggregation protocol
- PPP Point-to-Point Protocol
- PPTP Point-to-Point Tunneling Protocol
- PAP Password Authentication Protocol
- RPR IEEE 802.17 Resilient Packet Ring
- SLIP Serial Line Internet Protocol (obsolete)
- StarLAN
- Space Data Link Protocol, one of the norms for Space Data Link from the Consultative Committee for Space Data Systems
- STP Spanning Tree Protocol
- Split multi-link trunking Protocol
- Token Ring a protocol developed by IBM; the name can also be used to describe the token passing ring logical topology that it popularized.
- Virtual Extended Network (VEN) a protocol developed by iQuila.
- VTP VLAN Trunking Protocol
- VLAN Virtual Local Area Network

== Network Topology ==
- Asynchronous Transfer Mode (ATM)
- IS-IS, Intermediate System - Intermediate System (OSI)
- SPB Shortest Path Bridging
- MTP Message Transfer Part
- NSP Network Service Part
- TRILL (Transparent Interconnection of Lots of Links)

== Layer 2.5 ==
- ARP Address Resolution Protocol
- MPLS Multiprotocol Label Switching
- PPPoE Point-to-Point Protocol over Ethernet
- TIPC Transparent Inter-process Communication

== Layer 3 (Network Layer) ==
- CLNP Connectionless Networking Protocol
- IPX Internetwork Packet Exchange
- NAT Network Address Translation
- Routed-SMLT
- SCCP Signalling Connection Control Part
- AppleTalk DDP
- GLBP Gateway Load Balancing Protocol (a Cisco proprietary protocol)
- HSRP Hot Standby Router protocol
- VRRP Virtual Router Redundancy Protocol
- IP Internet Protocol
- ICMP Internet Control Message Protocol
- ARP Address Resolution Protocol
- RIP Routing Information Protocol (v1 and v2)
- OSPF Open Shortest Path First (v1 and v2)
- IPSEC IPsec
- WireGuard WireGuard

== Layer 3+4 (Protocol Suites) ==
- AppleTalk
- DECnet
- IPX/SPX
- Internet Protocol Suite
- OSI protocols
- Xerox Network Systems

== Layer 4 (Transport Layer) ==
- AEP AppleTalk Echo Protocol
- AH Authentication Header over IP or IPSec
- DCCP Datagram Congestion Control Protocol
- ESP Encapsulating Security Payload over IP or IPSec
- FCP Fibre Channel Protocol
- IL Originally developed as transport layer for 9P
- iSCSI Internet Small Computer System Interface
- NetBIOS NetBIOS, File Sharing and Name Resolution
- NBF NetBIOS Frames protocol
- NBP Name Binding Protocol {for AppleTalk}
- QUIC
- SCTP Stream Control Transmission Protocol
- Sinec H1 for telecontrol
- TUP, Telephone User Part
- SPX Sequenced Packet Exchange
- TCP Transmission Control Protocol
- UDP User Datagram Protocol
- VXLAN Virtual eXtensible LAN
- RDP Reliable Data Protocol {A protocol stack covers Layer 4 - Layer 7}

== Layer 5 (Session Layer) ==
This layer, presentation Layer and application layer are combined in TCP/IP model.

- 9P Distributed file system protocol developed originally as part of Plan 9
- ADSP AppleTalk Data Stream Protocol
- ASP AppleTalk Session Protocol
- H.245 Call Control Protocol for Multimedia Communications
- iSNS — Internet Storage Name Service
- NetBIOS, File Sharing and Name Resolution protocol - the basis of file sharing with Windows.
- NetBEUI, NetBIOS Enhanced User Interface
- NCP NetWare Core Protocol
- PAP Printer Access Protocol
- RPC Remote Procedure Call
- RTCP RTP Control Protocol
- SDP Session Description Protocol {Used to describe multimedia sessions}
- SMB Server Message Block
- SMPP Short Message Peer-to-Peer
- SOCKS "SOCKetS"
- ZIP Zone Information Protocol {For AppleTalk}
- This layer provides session management capabilities between hosts. For example, if some host needs a password verification for access and if credentials are provided then for that session password verification does not happen again. This layer can assist in synchronization, dialog control and critical operation management (e.g., an online bank transaction).

== Layer 6 (Presentation Layer) ==
- TLS Transport Layer Security
- SSL Secure Socket Tunneling
- AFP Apple Filing Protocol
- Independent Computing Architecture (ICA), the Citrix system core protocol
- Lightweight Presentation Protocol (LPP)
- NetWare Core Protocol (NCP)
- Network Data Representation (NDR)
- Tox, The Tox protocol is sometimes regarded as part of both the presentation and application layer
- eXternal Data Representation (XDR)
- X.25 Packet Assembler/Disassembler Protocol (PAD)

== Layer 7 (Application Layer) ==
- SOAP Simple Object Access Protocol
- Simple Service Discovery Protocol, A discovery protocol employed by UPnP
- TCAP Transaction Capabilities Application Part
- UPnP Universal Plug and Play
- DHCP Dynamic Host Configuration Protocol
- DNS Domain Name System
- BOOTP Bootstrap Protocol
- HTTP HyperText Transfer Protocol
- HTTPS HyperText Transfer Protocol Secure
- WebSocket
- NFS Network File System
- POP3 Post Office Protocol
- RTSP Real Time Streaming Protocol
- SMTP Simple Mail Transfer Protocol
- SNMP Simple Network Management Protocol
- FTP File Transfer Protocol
- NTP Network Time Protocol
- IRC Internet Relay Chat
- Telnet Tele Communication Protocol
- SSH Secure Shell Protocol
- IMAP Internet Message Access Protocol
- Gemini

== Other protocols ==
- Controller Area Network

== Protocol description languages ==
- Abstract Syntax Notation One (ASN.1)

== See also ==
- List of automation protocols
- Systems Network Architecture (SNA) developed by IBM
- Distributed System Security Architecture (DSSA)
- OSI model
