= Signaling gateway =

A signaling gateway is a network component responsible for transferring signaling messages (i.e. information related to call establishment, billing, location, short messages, address conversion, and other services) between Common Channel Signaling (CCS) nodes that communicate using different protocols and transports. Transport conversion is often from SS7 to IP.

A SIGTRAN Signaling Gateway is a network component that performs packet level translation of signaling from common channel signaling (based upon SS7) to SIGTRAN signaling (based upon IP). The concept of the SIGTRAN signaling gateway was introduced in the IETF document: RFC 2719: Architectural Framework for Signaling Transport.

A signaling gateway can be implemented as an embedded component of some other network element, or can be provided as a stand-alone network element. For example: a signaling gateway is often part of a softswitch in modern VoIP deployments. The signaling gateway function can also be included within the larger operational domain of a Signal Transfer Point (STP).

Protocol conversion gateways can also convert from one network operational paradigm to another – for example, SIP to ISUP for call control, SIP to TCAP for address translation, or SIP to MAP for location or presence.

== See also ==
- Media gateway
