= E.214 =

ITU-T Recommendation

- Structure of the land mobile global title for the signalling connection control part (SCCP)
- Status: In force
- Year started: 1988
- Latest version: (02/05); February 2005
- Organization: ITU-T
- Related standards: E.123, E.164
- Domain: telephony
- Website: https://www.itu.int/rec/T-REC-E.214/

In mobile telecommunications network routing, E.214 is one of three prevailing numbering plans used for delivering mobility management related messages.

The E.164 numbering plan, which is a maximum of 15 digits and usually written with a "+" prefix, is the historic first-generation format representing the phone number. The E.212 is a second-generation number plan used in America, extended to include the subscriber's MSIN (Mobile Subscription Identification Number) within the network's customer base. The E.214, developed under European GSM (Global System for Mobile Communications) standards, is a comparable extended second-generation format used outside America and can be more or less than 15 digits.

In routing a transatlantic mobile call, numbers routed from European networks are converted from E.214 numbers into E.212 numbers at the boundary incoming toward America (this can mean the Signaling Transfer Point at the edge of the American operator's network). In the outgoing direction, from America toward the rest of the world, numbers are converted from the E.212 standard to the E.214 standard.

This process, called global title translation, is the SS7 equivalent to IP routing. E.214 numbers are routed separately from E.164 numbers since they are marked with a different Numbering Plan Indicator. However, it is possible to reuse the Global Title analysis tables used E.164 numbers everywhere except for the final destination network of the message. This saves considerable administrative work.
