= Message Transfer Part =

Part of Signaling System 7 (SS7)

SS7 protocol suite
- SS7 protocols by OSI layer
- Application: INAP, MAP, IS-41... TCAP, CAP, ISUP, ...
- Network: MTP Level 3 + SCCP
- Data link: MTP Level 2
- Physical: MTP Level 1

The Message Transfer Part (MTP) is part of the Signaling System 7 (SS7) used for communication in Public Switched Telephone Networks. MTP is responsible for reliable, unduplicated and in-sequence transport of SS7 messages between communication partners.

MTP is formally defined primarily in ITU-T recommendations Q.701, Q.702, Q.703, Q.704 and Q.705. Tests for the MTP are specified in the ITU-T recommendations Q.781 for MTP2 and in Q.782 for MTP3. These tests are used to validate the correct implementation of the MTP protocol.

Different countries use different variants of the MTP protocols. In North America, the formal standard followed is ANSI T1.111. In Europe, national MTP protocols are based on ETSI EN 300-0088-1.

== Functional levels ==
The SS7 stack can be separated into four functional levels: Level 1 through Level 3 comprise the MTP, and Level 4 the MTP user. MTP Level 3 is sometimes abbreviated MTP3; MTP Level 2, MTP2. MTP and SCCP are together referred to as the Network Service Part (NSP).

There is no one-to-one mapping of MTP Levels 1 through 3 onto the OSI model. Instead, MTP provides the functionality of layers 1, 2 and part of layer 3 in the OSI model. The part of layer 3 of the OSI model that MTP does not provide, is provided by SCCP or other Level 4 parts (MTP users).

=== Signalling Data Link Functional Level ===
MTP Level 1 is described in ITU-T Recommendation Q.702, and provides the Signalling Data Link functional level for narrowband signalling links. For broadband signalling links, ITU-T Recommendation Q.2110 or Q.2111 describe the signalling data link function.

MTP1 represents the physical layer. That is, the layer that is responsible for the connection of SS7 Signaling Points into the transmission network over which they communicate with each other. Primarily, this involves the conversion of messaging into electrical signal and the maintenance of the physical links through which these pass. In this way, it is analogous to the Layer 1 of ISDN or other, perhaps more familiar, protocols.

MTP1 normally uses a timeslot in an E-carrier or T-carrier. The Physical interfaces defined include E-1 (2048 kbit/s; 32 64 kbit/s channels), DS-1 (1544 kbit/s; 24 64 kbit/s channels), V.35 (64 kbit/s), DS-0 (64 kbit/s), and DS-0A (56 kbit/s).

=== Signalling Link Functional Level ===
MTP Level 2 is described in ITU-T Recommendation Q.703, and provides the Signalling Link functional level for narrowband signalling links. For broadband signalling links, ITU-T Recommendation Q.2140 and Q.2210 describe the signalling link function referred to as MTP3b. The signalling link functional level may also be provided using the SIGTRAN protocol M2PA described in RFC 4165.

MTP Level 2 ensures accurate end-to-end transmission of a message across a signaling link.

MTP2 provides flow control, error detection and sequence checking, and retransmits unacknowledged messages. MTP2 uses packets called signal units to transmit SS7 messages. There are three types of signal units: Fill-in Signal Unit (FISU), Link Status Signal Unit (LSSU), Message Signal Unit (MSU).

Access to the signalling link functional level's service interface can be provided over SCTP by the SIGTRAN protocol M2UA, described in RFC 3331.

MTP Level 2 is tested using the protocol tester and test specifications described in Q.755, Q.755.1, Q.780 and Q.781.

=== Signalling Network Functional Level ===
MTP Level 3 is described in ITU-T Recommendation Q.704, and provides the Signalling Network functional level for narrowband signalling links and, with only minor modifications described in ITU-T Recommendation Q.2210, for broadband signalling links. The functions of MTP Level 3 may also be replaced with the Generic Signalling Transport Service described in ITU-T Recommendation Q.2150.0 as provided by MTP3b (Q.2150.1), SSCOP or SSCOPMCE (Q.2150.2) or SCTP (Q.2150.3). MTP Level 3 functions can also be provided by using the IETF SIGTRAN M3UA protocol, described in RFC 4666, in IPSP mode.

MTP3 provides routing functionality to transport signaling messages through the SS7 network to the requested endpoint. Each network element in the SS7 network has a unique address, the Point Code (PC). Message routing is performed according to this address. A distinction is made between a Signaling Transfer Point (STP) which only performs MTP message routing functionalities and a Signaling End Point (SEP) which uses MTP to communicate with other SEPs (that is, telecom switches). MTP3 is also responsible for network management; when the availability of MTP2 data links changes. MTP3 establishes alternative links and re-routes traffic away from failed links and signaling points and propagates information about route availability through the network. Also controls traffic when congestion occurs.

Access to the signalling network functional level's service interface (as described in Q.701) can be provided over SCTP by the SIGTRAN protocol M3UA, described in RFC 4666.

MTP Level 3 is tested using the protocol tester and test specifications described in Q.755, Q.755.1, Q.780 and Q.782.

=== MTP Users ===
Level 4 consists of MTP Users. The remaining components of the SS7 stack are all directly, or indirectly, MTP Users. Some examples of parts at Level 4 are SCCP, ISUP, TUP, and, in the UK, IUP. The services provided to MTP Level 4 by the MTP (that is, MTP to MTP Users) is described in ITU-T Recommendation Q.701.775148760
