= BICC =

BICC is an abbreviation with a number of meanings:

- British International College of Cairo (BICC), a British International British School in Cairo.
- Bangabandhu International Conference Center, formerly known as Bangladesh-China Friendship Conference Center (BCFCC), a Bangladeshi conference center.
- Bearer Independent Call Control, a telecommunications signalling protocol.
- Birendra International Convention Centre, an international state of the art convention center in Nepal.
- Bonn International Centre for Conflict Studies, formerly Bonn International Center for Conversion, a German research institute.
- British Insulated Callender's Cables, a major 20th-century British telecommunications and power cable manufacturer. It has since sold off cable interests and renamed after subsidiary Balfour Beatty.
- British Inter-University China Centre, a joint venture between Oxford, Bristol and Manchester universities.
- Business Intelligence Competency Center, a cross-functional organizational team that has defined tasks, roles, responsibilities and processes for supporting and promoting the effective use of Business Intelligence across an organization.
- Business and Industrial Coordinating Council, a non-profit agency established in 1963, Newark (N.J.). Its main objective was "Jobs for Minority People."
- British Iranian Chamber of Commerce, an agency building trade, finance and business relations.
