= CAMEL Application Part =

Signalling protocol used in the Intelligent Network architecture

SS7 protocol suite
- SS7 protocols by OSI layer
- Application: INAP, MAP, IS-41... TCAP, CAP, ISUP, ...
- Network: MTP Level 3 + SCCP
- Data link: MTP Level 2
- Physical: MTP Level 1

The CAMEL Application Part (CAP) is a signalling protocol used in the Intelligent Network (IN) architecture. CAP is a Remote Operations Service Element (ROSE) user protocol, and as such is layered on top of the Transaction Capabilities Application Part (TCAP) of the SS#7 protocol suite. CAP is based on a subset of the ETSI Core and allows for the implementation of carrier-grade, value added services such as unified messaging, prepaid, fraud control and Freephone in both the GSM voice and GPRS data networks. CAMEL is a means of adding intelligent applications to mobile (rather than fixed) networks. It builds upon established practices in the fixed line telephony business that are generally classed under the heading of (Intelligent Network Application Part) or INAP CS-2 protocol.

== Protocol specification ==
The CAMEL Application Part (CAP) portable, software provides mechanisms to support operator services beyond the standard GSM services for subscribers roaming within or outside the Home PLMN (HPLMN). The CAP product extends the IN framework to the GSM/3G networks for implementing IN-based services within GSM/3G networks.

CAMEL is used when the subscriber is roaming between networks, allowing the home network to monitor and control calls made by the subscriber. CAMEL provides services such as prepaid roaming services, fraud control, special numbers (e.g., 123 for voicemail that works everywhere) and closed user groups (e.g., office extension numbers that work everywhere).

As with CAMEL, CAP has been defined in four phases, each of which has an accompanying specification that builds upon the previous phase. Each CAP phase provides the message set and procedures needed to support the corresponding CAMEL phase requirements, as defined in 3GPP TS 22.078 (service aspects) and 3GPP TS 23.078 (technical realization).

The definition of the protocol may be considered to be split into three sections:

- the definition of the Single Association Control Function (SACF)/Multiple Association Control Function (MACF) rules for the protocol, defined within the prose of the specification;
- the definition of the operations transferred between entities, defined using Abstract Syntax Notation One (ASN.1);
- the definition of the actions taken at each entity, defined by the state transition diagrams.
