= Continuous Computing =

- Company type: Private
- Industry: Technology
- Founded: 1998
- Defunct: 2011
- Fate: Acquired by Radisys
- Headquarters: San Diego, California, United States
- Products: Embedded operating systems, Communications software, embedded computer products

Continuous Computing was a privately held company based in San Diego and founded in 1998 that provides telecom systems made up of telecom platforms and Trillium software, including protocol software stacks for femtocells and 4G wireless / Long Term Evolution (LTE). The company also sells standalone Trillium software products and ATCA hardware components, as well as professional services. Continuous Computing's Trillium software addresses LTE Femtocells (Home eNodeB) and pico / macro eNodeBs, as well as the Evolved Packet Core (EPC), Mobility Management Entity (MME), Serving Gateway (SWG) and Evolved Packet Data Gateway (ePDG).

The company is said to be the first systems vendor to introduce an end-to-end offering that spans the range of LTE network infrastructure from the Home NodeB (Macro / Pico base stations) to the Evolved Packet Core (EPC).

== History ==
In February 2003, Continuous Computing acquired Trillium Digital Systems' intellectual property, customers and also hired some Trillium engineering, sales and marketing staff from Intel Corporation.

In July 2004, Continuous Computing expanded with the opening of a major software development center in Bangalore, India. The company acquired key products, people, technology and other assets from China-based UP Technologies Ltd. in July 2005.

In October 2007, the company launched "FlexTCA" platforms, targeting the security and wireless core vertical telecom markets. In February 2008, Continuous Computing announced the availability of its upgraded Trillium 3G / 4G Wireless protocol software for comprehensive support of Universal Mobile Telecommunications System (UMTS) High-Speed Packet Access (HSPA) functionality in alignment with 3GPP Release 7 standards. These performance improvements increase the data rates and bandwidth over the air interface in 3G networks.

Continuous Computing also announced in February 2008 their partnership with picoChip Designs Ltd. This partnership was created to speed the development of the on-premises mobile wireless base station technology and offer a time-saving reference design to Network Equipment Providers (NEPs) entering the mobile space. The combination of Continuous' software and picoChip's silicon essentially removed a step in the femtocell product development process with a reference design.

In February 2009, Continuous Computing announced its new "Solutions & Services" business practice which offers two suites for the wireless and deep packet inspection (DPI) markets. In June 2009 Continuous Computing teamed with Texas Instruments to offer complete HSPA and LTE enterprise and residential femtocells.

In July 2009, the company announced value added services (VAS) designed to allow NEPs to accelerate time to market for their enhanced wireless services such as Short Message Service (SMS), Caller ID, roaming, E911, ringback tones and e-mail services.

In May 2011, the company announced they were acquired by RadiSys for $105 million in stock and cash. Once the transaction is completed, Continuous' CEO will take over the same position with RadiSys, while RadiSys CEO Scott Grout moves to the company's board of directors.

== Products ==
Continuous Computing's Trillium protocol software product line was acquired from Intel in February 2003. NEPs use Trillium to develop network elements for Femtocell, LTE/3G Wireless, IP Multimedia Subsystem (IMS) and NGN Voice over Internet Protocol (VoIP) applications.

The AdvancedTCA product family combined packet-based, redundant architecture design with NEBS Level 3 engineering and using PICMG standards and SAF interfaces.

FlexTCA is a product family that consists of ATCA platforms pre-integrated with essential services software, SAF-compliant high availability middleware, switching software, and a Trillium Protocol Integration toolkit.

== Customers ==
Continuous Computing has approximately 150 customers worldwide with applications including Femtocells and Signaling Gateways to Radio Network Controllers and Mobility Management Entities.
