= SSUTR2 =

French national variant of the Telephone User Part

French SSUTR2 (Système de signalisation par canal sémaphore CCITT no.7) is the French national variant of the Telephone User Part (TUP).
