= Session multiplexing =

Session multiplexing in a computer network is a service provided by the transport layer (see OSI Layered Model). It multiplexes several message streams, or sessions onto one logical link and keeps track of which messages belong to which sessions (see session layer). An example of session multiplexing—a single computer with one IP address has several websites open at once.
