= V5 interface =

Telephone network protocols

V5 is a family of telephone network protocols defined by ETSI which allow communications between the telephone exchange, also known in the specifications as the local exchange (LE), and the local loop. With potentially thousands of subscribers connected to the LE there is the problem of physically managing thousands of wires out to the local subscribers (and the costs associated with that). Prior to the specification of V5 the manufacturers of exchange equipment had proprietary solutions to the problem. These solutions did not inter-operate and meant being tied into a single manufacturer's method at each exchange.

V5 provided a standard set of protocols from the subscriber to the LE. The AN (or Access Network) was defined as a reference point. Signalling between this point and the LE was standardised and therefore allowed a multiple vendor solution, provided the specifications were followed. This resulted in a single link (or in the case of V5.2 multiple links) from the AN to the LE, reducing the need for many lines along this point (or more likely no need for a proprietary solution to manage the single link). The final link to the local loop remained the same with digital signalling (ISDN) and analogue signalling for basic telephony (also known as POTS in the industry).

The protocols are based on the principle of common-channel signaling where message-based signalling for all subscribers uses the same signalling channel(s) rather than separate channels existing for different subscribers.

V5 comes in two forms:

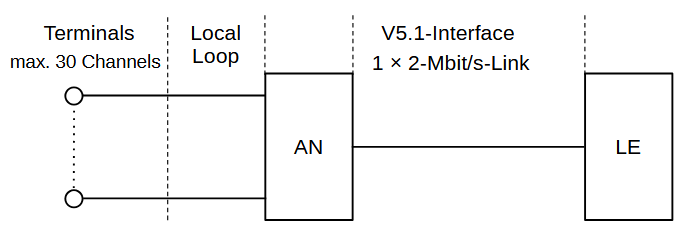
Schematic diagram of an access network with V5.1 interface

- V5.1 (ETS 300 324-1) in which there is a 1 to 1 correspondence between subscriber lines and bearer channels in the aggregate link to the exchange. A V5.1 interface relates to a single aggregate E1 (2 Mbit/s) link between a multiplexer and an exchange.

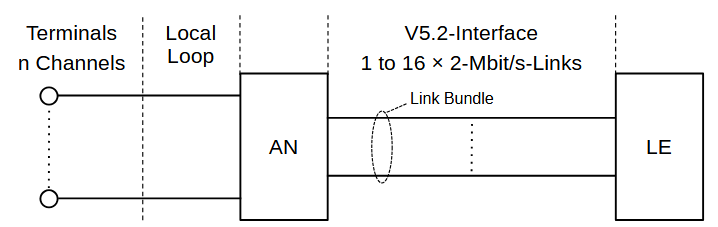
Schematic diagram of an access network with V5.2 interface

- V5.2 (ETS 300 347-1) which provides for concentration where there are not enough bearer channels in the aggregate link(s) to accommodate all subscribers at the same time. A single V5.2 interface can control up to 16 E1 links at once and can include protection of the signalling channels.

== The layer 3 protocols ==
- Control protocol - This controls the setup and basic management of the V5 link from the Access Network (AN) to the Local Exchange (LE).
- PSTN protocol - Translation of the analogue signals for POTS into a digital form for transfer from AN to LE. (i.e. off-hook, digit dialling, on hook etc.).
- BCC protocol - In V5.2 since any channel could be allocated to the call, this protocol is assigned the job of managing the assignment of channels to a call. (Only in v5.2)
- Link control protocol - For managing up to 16 E1 links. It controls the status of the links (i.e. in service/out of service).
- Protection protocol - Used in V5.2; this protocol is duplicated on two or more channels on two or more links and provides instant failover in the event of one failing.

V5.1 only supports the Control, PSTN and ISDN protocols. V5.2 also supports BCC, Link Control and Protection protocols.

V5 layer 3 protocols are transported on a layer 2 protocol called LAPV5, a variation of the LAP-D or Link Access Procedures, D channel ISDN transport layer.

V5 is a protocol stack which controls circuit-switched communication paths.

== Subsequent developments ==
Portions of V5 were re-used for a new service known as Narrowband Multimedia Delivery Service (or NMDS). In particular the PSTN protocol was re-used and combined with ISDN to provide a service to the subscriber. This allowed a digital connection to the subscribers house and the re-use of analogue phones across the digital connection. The AN reference point was replaced by an ISDN-like NTE. This NTE managed an analogue service and a basic rate ISDN service to the subscribers home.

== See also ==
- SS7 Signaling System Seven - for communications between exchanges.
- OSI model
- BT Highway British Telecom's NMDS implementation.

== Bibliography ==
- ETSI EN 300 347-1 (1999-12-28). V interfaces at the digital Local Exchange (LE); V5.2 interface for the support of Access Network (AN); Part 1: V5.2 interface specification (V2.2.2 ed.). Valbonne: ETSI.
- ETSI EN 300 324-1 (2000-04-08). V interfaces at the digital Local Exchange (LE); V5.1 interface for the support of Access Network (AN); Pat 1: V5.1 interface specification (V2.1.1 ed.). Valbonne: ETSI.
