= Circuit identification code =

The ISDN Services User Part (ISUP) Circuit Identification Code (CIC) is part of the Signaling System #7 which is used to set up telephone calls in Public Switched Telephone Networks as part of the Initial Address Message (IAM).

When a telephone call is set up from one subscriber to another, many telephone exchanges will be involved, possibly across international boundaries. To allow a call to be set up correctly, where ISUP is supported, a switch will signal call-related information like called or calling party number to the next switch in the network using ISUP messages. The CIC provides information about where the voice part of the call is carried - on which trunk and in which timeslot.
