= SIGTRAN =

SIGTRAN is the name, derived from signaling transport, of the former Internet Task Force (I) working group that produced specifications for a family of protocols that provide reliable datagram service and user layer adaptations for Signaling System and ISDN communications protocols. The SIGTRAN protocols are an extension of the SS7 protocol family, and they support the same application and call management paradigms as SS7. However, the SIGTRAN protocols use an Internet Protocol (IP) transport called Stream Control Transmission Protocol (SCTP), instead of TCP or UDP. Indeed, the most significant protocol defined by the SIGTRAN group is SCTP, which is used to carry PSTN signaling over IP.

The SIGTRAN group was significantly influenced by telecommunications engineers intent on using the new protocols for adapting IP networks to the PSTN with special regard to signaling applications. Recently, SCTP is finding applications beyond its original purpose wherever reliable datagram service is desired.

SIGTRAN has been published in RFC 2719, under the title Framework Architecture for Signaling Transport. RFC 2719 also defines the concept of a signaling gateway (SG), which converts Common Channel Signaling (CCS) messages from SS7 to SIGTRAN. Implemented in a variety of network elements including softswitches, the SG function can provide significant value to existing common channel signaling networks, leveraging investments associated with SS7 and delivering the cost/performance values associated with IP transport.

== SIGTRAN protocols ==
The SIGTRAN family of protocols includes:

- Stream Control Transmission Protocol (SCTP), RFC 2960, RFC 3873, RFC 4166, RFC 4960.
- ISDN User Adaptation (IUA), RFC 4233, RFC 5133.
- Message Transfer Part 2 (MTP) User Peer-to-Peer Adaptation Layer (M2PA), RFC 4165.
- Message Transfer Part 2 User Adaptation Layer (M2UA), RFC 3331.
- Message Transfer Part 3 User Adaptation Layer (M3UA), RFC 4666.
- Signalling Connection Control Part (SCCP) User Adaptation (SUA), RFC 3868.
- V5 User Adaptation (V5UA), RFC 3807.
- DPNSS/DASS2 User Adaption (DUA), RFC 4129

The Stream Control Transmission Protocol provides the transport protocol for SIGTRAN user adaptation layer messages across an IP network. It is described in RFC 3873, RFC 4166 and RFC 4960.

IUA provides an SCTP adaptation layer for the seamless backhaul of Q.921 user messages and service interface across an IP network. Some users that it supports are Q.931 and QSIG. It is specified in RFC 4233.

V5UA provides an SCTP adaptation layer for the seamless backhaul of V5.2 user messages and service interface across an IP network. It is a variation of IUA and is specified in RFC 3807.

M2PA provides an SCTP adaptation layer for providing an SS7 MTP signaling link over an IP network. It is specified in RFC 4165. The difference between M2PA and M2UA is described in section 1.9 of RFC 4165

M2UA provides an SCTP adaptation layer for the seamless backhaul of MTP Level 2 user messages and service interface across an IP network. It is specified in RFC 3331.

M3UA provides an SCTP adaptation layer for the seamless backhaul or peering of MTP Level 3 user messages and service interface across an IP network. It is specified in RFC 4666.

SUA provides an SCTP adaptation layer for the seamless backhaul or peering of Signalling Connection Control Part user messages and service interface across an IP network. It is specified in RFC 3868.

=== Scheme ===
SS7 protocols					SCCP		
SS7 protocols	V5.2	MTP3	MTP3	ISUP	TCAP	DSS1	TCAP
SIGTRAN	V5UA	M2UA	M2PA	M3UA		IUA	SUA
