= Endpoint Handlespace Redundancy Protocol =

The Endpoint Handlespace Redundancy Protocol is used by the Reliable server pooling (RSerPool) framework for the communication between Pool Registrars to maintain and synchronize a handlespace.

It is allocated on the application layer like the Aggregate Server Access Protocol. It is a work in progress within the IETF.
