= Subsystem number =

Signalling Connection Control Part (SCCP) subsystem numbers are used to identify applications within network entities which use SCCP signalling.

== GSM and UMTS SSNs ==
In Global System for Mobile Communications (GSM) and Universal Mobile Telecommunications System (UMTS), subsystem numbers may be used between Public land mobile networks (PLMNs), in which case they are taken from the globally standardized range (1 - 31) or the part of the national network range (129 - 150) reserved for GSM/UMTS use between PLMNs. For use within a PLMN, numbers are taken from the part of the national network range (32 - 128 & 151 - 254) not reserved for GSM/UMTS use between PLMNs.

The following globally standardized subsystem numbers have been allocated for use by GSM/UMTS:

 0  Not used/Unknown
 1  SCCP MG
 6  HLR (MAP)
 7  VLR (MAP)
 8  MSC (MAP)
 9  EIR (MAP)
 10 is allocated for evolution (possible Authentication Centre).

The following national network subsystem numbers have been allocated for use within GSM/UMTS networks:

 249  PCAP
 250  BSC (BSSAP-LE)
 251  MSC (BSSAP-LE)
 252  SMLC (BSSAP-LE)
 253  BSS O&M (A interface)
 254  BSSAP (A interface)

The following national network subsystem numbers have been allocated for use within and between GSM/UMTS networks:

 142  RANAP
 143  RNSAP
 145  GMLC (MAP)
 146  CAP
 147  gsmSCF (MAP) or IM-SSF (MAP)
 148  SIWF (MAP)
 149  SGSN (MAP)
 150  GGSN (MAP)
 241  INAP

== North American (ANSI) SSNs ==
 232  CNAM (Calling Name)
 247  LNP
 248  800 number translation (AIN0.1)
 254  800 number translation (TCAP)
