= Interconnect User Part =

Interconnect User Part (IUP) is a national specific Signaling System 7 protocol for interconnect between public telephone networks in the United Kingdom. This protocol was formerly known as BTNUP.

It is specified in document PNO-ISC/SPEC/006 which is published by the NICC as ND1006:2007/05.
