= Broadcast/Multicast Control =

Protocol sublayer

The Broadcast/Multicast control (BMC) is a sublayer of the layer 2 protocol of Radio Interface Protocol Architecture as per BMC-STD. It exists in the user plane only. It is located above the Radio Link Control (RLC), a layer 2 responsible for mapping logical channels. It is similar to 802.11's LLC layer which supports multimode operations and it works in three different modes:

a) Transparent 
b) Unacknowledged data transfer 
c) Acknowledged data transfer. Its main function is to deliver "Cell Broadcast" messages to its upper layer such as NAS.

Other functions specified in [3GPP TS 25.301] are:

- Storage of Cell Broadcast Messages.
- Traffic volume monitoring and radio resource request for CBS.
- Scheduling of BMC messages.
- Transmission of BMC messages to UE.
- Delivery of Cell Broadcast messages to upper layer (NAS).

Except for broadcast/multicast it operates in transparent mode as per [BMC-STD]. On the uplink BMC it requires Unacknowledged mode of data transfer from RLC.
