= Remote Operations Service Element protocol =

Communication protocol

The Remote Operations Service Element (ROSE) is the OSI service interface, specified in ITU-T Recommendation X.219, ISO/IEC International Standard 9072-1, that (a) provides remote operation capabilities, (b) allows interaction between entities in a distributed application, and (c) upon receiving a remote operations service request, allows the receiving entity to attempt the operation and report the results of the attempt to the requesting entity.

OSI application protocols such as X.400 and X.500 use the services provided by ROSE. The ROSE protocol itself is defined using the notation of ASN.1.

== See also ==
- Remote procedure call
- Abstract Syntax Notation One
- Transaction Capabilities Application Part
