= INAP =

SS7 protocol suite
- SS7 protocols by OSI layer
- Application: INAP, MAP, IS-41... TCAP, CAP, ISUP, ...
- Network: MTP Level 3 + SCCP
- Data link: MTP Level 2
- Physical: MTP Level 1

INAP stands for Intelligent Network Application Protocol or Intelligent Network Application Part. It is the signalling protocol used in Intelligent Networking (IN). It is part of the Signalling System No. 7 (SS7) protocol suite, typically layered on top of the Transaction Capabilities Application Part (TCAP). It can also be termed as logic for controlling telecommunication services migrated from traditional switching points to computer based service independent platform.

== Applications ==
The International Telecommunication Union (ITU) defines several "capability levels" for this protocol, starting with Capability Set 1 (CS-1). A typical application for the IN is a Number Translation service. For example, in the United Kingdom, 0800 numbers are freephone numbers and are translated to a geographic number using an IN platform. The Telephone exchanges decode the 0800 numbers to an IN trigger and the exchange connects to the IN.

The telephone exchange uses Transaction Capabilities Application Part (TCAP), Signaling Connection and Control Part (SCCP) and INAP and in IN terms is a service switching point (SSP). It sends an INAP Initial Detection Point (IDP) message to the service control point (SCP). The SCP returns an INAP Connect message, which contains a geographic number to forward the call to.

INAP messages are defined using ASN.1 encoding. SCCP is used for the routing. Extended form of INAP is Customised Applications for Mobile networks Enhanced Logic (CAMEL). TCAP is used to separate the transactions into discrete units.
