= Point code =

Identifier for routing telephony signals

An SS7 point code is an address for the SS7 telephone switching system. It is similar to an IP address in an IP network. It is a unique address for a node (Signaling Point, or SP), used in MTP layer 3 to identify the destination of a message signal unit (MSU).

Message contain an OPC (Originating Point Code) and a DPC (Destination Point Code); sometimes documents refer to it as a signaling point code. Depending on the network, a point code can be 24 bits (North America, China), 16 bits (Japan), or 14 bits (ITU standard, International SS7 network and most countries) in length.

ANSI point codes use 24 bits, mostly in 8-8-8 format. ITU point codes use 14 bits in 3-8-3 format.

Fourteen bit point codes can be written in multiple formats. The most common are decimal number, hexadecimal number, or 3-8-3 format (3 most significant bits, 8 middle bits, 3 least significant bits).

Twenty-four bit point codes may be written in decimal, hexadecimal, or 8-8-8 format.

== Abbreviations ==
- OPC Originating Point Code
- DPC Destination Point Code
- ISPC International Signaling Point Code
