= IS-41 =

SS7 protocol suite
- SS7 protocols by OSI layer
- Application: INAP, MAP, IS-41... TCAP, CAP, ISUP, ...
- Network: MTP Level 3 + SCCP
- Data link: MTP Level 2
- Physical: MTP Level 1

IS-41, also known as ANSI-41, is a mobile, cellular telecommunications system standard to support mobility management by enabling the networking of switches. ANSI-41 is the standard now approved for use as the network-side companion to the wireless-side AMPS (analog), IS-136 (Digital AMPS), cdmaOne, and CDMA2000 networks. It competes with GSM MAP, but the two will eventually merge to support worldwide roaming.

IS-41 facilitates inter-switch operations like handoff and roaming authentication. IS-41 evolved through revisions 0, A, B, C, D, and E with increasingly robust and distributed call processing between switches and their roamer databases. To describe IS-41 messaging requires special terminology to designate the telephone call's originating and terminating switch, called an MSC (anchor-MSC, candidate-MSC, homing-MSC, serving MSC and target MSC) and databases called VLR and HLR. For handoffs the messaging is between switches. For roaming and authentication, the messaging would include an HLR and a VLR. In both cases, the PSTN may be needed to carry messaging.
