= Signalling Connection Control Part =

SS7 protocol suite
- SS7 protocols by OSI layer
- Application: INAP, MAP, IS-41... TCAP, CAP, ISUP, ...
- Network: MTP Level 3 + SCCP
- Data link: MTP Level 2
- Physical: MTP Level 1

The Signalling Connection Control Part (SCCP) is a network layer protocol that provides extended routing, flow control, segmentation, connection-orientation, and error correction facilities in Signaling System 7 telecommunications networks. SCCP relies on the services of MTP for basic routing and error detection.

== Published specification ==
The base SCCP specification is defined by the ITU-T, in recommendations Q.711 to Q.714, with additional information to implementors provided by Q.715 and Q.716. There are, however, regional variations defined by local standards bodies. In the United States, ANSI publishes its modifications to Q.713 as ANSI T1.112. The TTC publishes as JT-Q.711 to JT-Q.714, and Europe ETSI publishes ETSI EN 300-009-1: both of which document their modifications to the ITU-T specifications.

== Routing facilities beyond MTP ==
Although MTP provides routing capabilities based on the Point Code, SCCP allows routing using a Point Code and Subsystem number or a Global Title.

A Point Code is used to address a particular node on the network, whereas a Subsystem number addresses a specific application available on that node. SCCP employs a process called Global Title Translation to determine Point Codes from Global Titles so as to instruct MTP on where to route messages.

SCCP messages contain parameters which describe the type of addressing used, and how the message should be routed:

- Address Indicator
  - Routing indicator
    - Route on Global Title
    - Route on Point Code/Subsystem Number
  - Global title indicator
    - No Global Title
    - Global Title includes Translation Type (TT), Numbering Plan Indicator (NPI) and Type of Number (TON)
    - Global Title includes Translation Type only
  - Subsystem indicator
    - Subsystem Number present
    - Subsystem Number not present
  - Point Code indicator
    - Point Code present
    - Point Code not present
- Global Title
  - Address Indicator Coding
  - Address Indicator coded as national (the Address Indicator is treated as international if not specified)

== Protocol classes ==
SCCP provides 4 classes of protocol for its applications:

- Class 0: Basic connectionless.
- Class 1: Sequenced connectionless.
- Class 2: Basic connection-oriented.
- Class 3: Flow control connection oriented.

The connectionless protocol classes provide the capabilities needed to transfer one Network Service Data Unit (NSDU) in the "data" field of an XUDT, LUDT or UDT message. When one connectionless message is not sufficient to convey the user data contained in one NSDU, a segmenting/reassembly function for protocol classes 0 and 1 is provided. In this case, the SCCP at the originating node or in a relay node provides segmentation of the information into multiple segments prior to transfer in the "data" field of XUDT (or as a network option LUDT) messages. At the destination node, the NSDU is reassembled.

The connection-oriented protocol classes (protocol classes 2 and 3) provide the means to set up signalling connections in order to exchange a number of related NSDUs. The connection-oriented protocol classes also provide a segmenting and reassembling capability. If an NSDU is longer than 255 octets, it is split into multiple segments at the originating node, prior to transfer in the "data" field of DT messages. Each segment is less than or equal to 255 octets. At the destination node, the NSDU is reassembled.

=== Class 0: Basic connectionless ===
The SCCP Class 0 protocol class is the most basic of the SCCP protocol classes. Network Service Data Units passed by higher layers in the originating node are delivered by the SCCP to higher layers in the destination node. They are transferred independently of each other. Therefore, they may be delivered to the SCCP user out-of-sequence. Thus, this protocol class corresponds to a pure connectionless network service. As a connectionless protocol, no network connection is established between the sender and the receiver.

=== Class 1: Sequenced connectionless ===
SCCP Class 1 builds on the capabilities of Class 0, with the addition of a sequence control parameter in the NSDU which allows the SCCP User to instruct the SCCP that a given stream of messages should be delivered in sequence. Therefore, Protocol Class 1 corresponds to an enhanced connectionless protocol with assurances of in-sequence delivery.

=== Class 2: Basic connection-oriented ===
SCCP Class 2 provides the facilities of Class 1, but also allows for an entity to establish a two-way dialog with another entity using SCCP.

=== Class 3: Flow control connection oriented ===
Class 3 service builds upon Class 2, but also allows for expedited (urgent) messages to be sent and received, and for errors in sequencing (segment re-assembly) to be detected and for SCCP to restart a connection should this occur.

== Transport over IP networks ==
In the SIGTRAN suite of protocols, there are two primary methods of transporting SCCP applications across Internet Protocol networks: SCCP can be transported indirectly using the MTP level 3 User Adaptation protocol (M3UA), a protocol which provides support for users of MTP-3—including SCCP. Alternatively, SCCP applications can operate directly over the SCCP User Adaptation protocol (SUA) which is a form of modified SCCP designed specifically for use in IP networking.

ITU-T also provides for the transport of SCCP users over Internet Protocol using the Generic Signalling Transport service specified in Q.2150.0, the signalling transport converter for SCTP specified in Q.2150.3 and a specialized Transport-Independent Signalling Connection Control Part (TI-SCCP) specified in T-REC-Q.2220. TI-SCCP can also be used with the Generic Signalling Transport adapted for MTP3 and MTP3b as described in Q.2150.1, or adapted for SSCOP or SSCOPMCE as described in Q.2150.2.
