= Telephone User Part =

Telephone User Part (TUP) provides conventional PSTN telephony services across the Signalling System No. 7 (SS7) network. TUP was the first layer 4 protocol defined by the standards bodies and as such did not provision for ISDN services. It has now largely been replaced by ISUP. However, it can still be found in operational use in some parts of the world (e.g., China).

TUP is defined in ITU-T Recommendations Q.721-725. These define the international telephone call control signalling functions for use over SS7.

Various national variants of TUP have evolved, some of which provide varying degrees of support for ISDN. E.g. French SSUTR2 and Chinese TUP (Specification GF001-9001).
