= ISDN User Part =

Concept in telephony

SS7 protocol suite
- SS7 protocols by OSI layer
- Application: INAP, MAP, IS-41... TCAP, CAP, ISUP, ...
- Network: MTP Level 3 + SCCP
- Data link: MTP Level 2
- Physical: MTP Level 1

The ISDN (Integrated Services Digital Network) User Part or ISUP is part of Signaling System No. 7 (SS7), which is used to set up telephone calls in the public switched telephone network (PSTN). It is specified by the ITU-T as part of the Q.76x series.

When a telephone call is set up from one subscriber to another, several telephone exchanges could be involved, possibly across international boundaries. To allow a call to be set up correctly, where ISUP is supported, a switch will signal call-related information like called party number to the next switch in the network using ISUP messages.

The telephone exchanges may be connected via T1 or E1 trunks which transport the speech from the calls. These trunks are divided into 64 kbit/s timeslots, and one timeslot can carry exactly one call. Regardless of what facilities are used to interconnect switches, each circuit between two switches is uniquely identified by a circuit identification code (CIC) that is included in the ISUP messages. The exchange uses this information along with the received signaling information (especially the called party number) to determine which inbound and outbound circuits should be connected together to provide an end to end speech path.

In addition to call related information, ISUP is also used to exchange status information for, and permit management of, the available circuits. In the case of no outbound circuit being available on a particular exchange, a release message is sent back to the preceding switches in the chain.

== ISUP variants ==
Different ISUP variants exist. ITU-T specifies the variant used in the international network. In Europe ETSI releases its own ISUP specification which is close that of the ITU-T. ITU-T ISUP is used for international connections and is the base for some national ISUP variants. Most countries have their own variation of ISUP to cover national requirements. ANSI specifies variations of ISUP utilized under the North American Numbering Plan; however, some countries under the NANP differ in their support of some procedures (for example, LATA is meaningless within Canada. Also, RBOCs support Telcordia procedures not fully specified by ANSI.) Some countries outside the NANP support ANSI-based variants (e.g. Mexico).

While these variations of ISUP differ in subtle ways, the vast majority of ISUP message type, parameter type, and parameter field code-points, and related fundamental call processing procedures, agree across all variants.

=== ITU-T specification versions ===
- 1980 – ISUP Yellow Book
- 1984 – ISUP Red Book
- 1988 – ISUP Blue Book
- 1991 – ISUP Q.767
- 1992 – ISUP'92 White Book (segmentation, compatibility, new supplementary services)
- 1997 – ISUP'97 (new procedures, IN CS1, new supplementary services)

According to ITU-T Q.761 section 2.4.1 ISUP interworking ISUP'92 is backwards compatible with ISUP Blue Book and Q.767 for basic call procedures and supplementary services except for some procedures (e.g. number portability). Additionally the compatibility features introduced in this version ensure forward compatibility with newer versions.

== Message types ==
An ISUP message contains a fixed header containing the circuit identification code and the ISUP message type, followed by a mandatory fixed-length parameter part, a mandatory variable-length parameter part, and an optional parameter part that are dependent on the type of message being sent. ISUP messages can be sent using the services of the Message Transfer Part, or, less often, the Signalling Connection Control Part. These messages are transmitted in various stages of call setup and release. The most common messages are:

- Initial address message (IAM) — First message sent to inform the partner switch that a call has to be established on the CIC contained in the message. Contains the called number, type of service (speech or data) and optional parameters.
- Subsequent address message (SAM) — For networks that support overlap dialing procedures, and then in the case that the IAM did not contain the full called number, one or more SAMs follow containing additional digits. This message is not supported by networks that only support en bloc dialing procedures.
- Address complete message (ACM) — Message returned from the terminating switch when the subscriber is reached and the phone starts ringing, or when the call traverses an interworking point and the intermediate trunk is seized.
- Call progress (CPG) — Contains additional information about the progress of a call. Normally sent after the ACM when the status of the call changes from that reported in the ACM.
- Answer message (ANM) — Sent when the subscriber picks up the phone, a resource is connected or answer supervision is returned by an interworking point. Normally charging starts at this moment. It is required that the call be cut through in both directions by this point.
- Connect (CON) — Sent when the call is answered by an automatic terminal. This message replaces the ACM, CPG and ANM for calls that are answered by automatic terminals.
- Release (REL) — Sent to clear the call when a subscriber goes on hook. This is also sent (in direct response to an IAM) if the terminating switch determines that the call cannot be completed. In either case, the terminating switch provides a cause value in the message to explain the reason for the release, e.g., "User busy".
- Release complete (RLC) — Acknowledgment of the release – the circuit is idle afterward and can be used again.

== Sample call flow ==
This is a very basic call flow involving only two telecom switches which exchange the ISUP messages. The subscriber interfaces are not covered here and are only listed for a better understanding.

 A subscriber     telco switch A    telco switch B     B subscriber
Off hook
      Dial digits --->
                            -- IAM -->
                                                -Ringing ->
                            <-- ACM --                    Off hook
                            <-- ANM --
-----------------------    Conversation    -----------------------
On hook                     -- REL -->                  On hook
                            <-- RLC --

Detailed call flows are provided in ITU-T Recommendation Q.784.1.

Below is a detailed exchange of ISUP messages involving two ISDN telecom switches. The report was from an Alcatel S12 digital switch.

   BENIN             2005-07-15  16:49:16  FR      
                           00121  00000000   G159CA01   L6X8AA47    
   SWA-ORJ-OBSERVATION                                             
                                                                  SYSTEM REPORT
      -------------------------------------------------------------------------
      OBSERVATION/CALL SAMPLING                                    SUCCESSFUL
      -----------------------------------------------------------------------
      TYPE OF OBSERVATION: ORIGINATING
      DATE            = 2005-07-15        TIME = 16:48:23:09
      CALLING DN      = 52250000
      CALLING CAT     = PRIORITY SUBSC 
      INC EQ NBR      = H'31   & 1    
      RCVD DIGITS     = 012625729                                           
      CALLED DN       = 012625729                   
      OTG TRNKGRP     = LAGOS_SC        
      OTG EQ NBR      = H'1111 & 16   
      BEARER          = AUDIO31 
      XFER MODE       = CIRCUIT SWITCHED
      CAUSE           = NORMALUN
      TERM SEIZED     = 0: 0: 2: 3
      THROUGH SWITCH  = 0: 0: 4: 3
      ANSWER          = 0: 0:14: 6
      RELEASE         = 0: 0:46: 3
      
      TAXATION INFO
      ------------- 
      CHARGED DN      = 52250000
      CALL DURATION   = 0: 0:31: 6
      COUNTS          = 2    
      TARIFF GRP      = 4                    TARIFF ID      = 7  
      RATE            = 20                   RANDOM CNT     = 0    
      SURCH UNITS     = 0                    CAT UNITS      = 0  
      TARIFF REG      = 1    
      
      RECEIVER SZD    = 0: 0: 0: 0      RECEIVER RLSD  = 0: 0: 4: 2
      REC EQ NBR      = H'13   & 6       REC RLS INFO   = FORCED RLSE   
      
      REC SIGNAL           DIRECTION          TIME
      -------------        ---------          ---- 
      REG-I-10             RECEIVED        0: 0: 1: 3
      REG-I-1              RECEIVED        0: 0: 1: 6
      REG-I-2              RECEIVED        0: 0: 1: 8
      REG-I-6              RECEIVED        0: 0: 2: 1
      REG-I-2              RECEIVED        0: 0: 2: 3
      REG-I-5              RECEIVED        0: 0: 2: 5
      REG-I-7              RECEIVED        0: 0: 3: 0
      REG-I-2              RECEIVED        0: 0: 3: 3
      REG-I-9              RECEIVED        0: 0: 3: 7
      
      INC SIG TYPE    = ANALOG-SUBSCR   
      
         SIGNAL            DIRECTION          TIME
      -------------        ---------          ---- 
      SEIZURE              RECEIVED        0: 0: 0: 0
      DIAL-TONE            SENT            0: 0: 0: 0
      CLEAR-FW-FW          RECEIVED        0: 0:46: 1
      
      OTG SIG TYPE    = ISUP-NAT        
      
        MESSAGE            DIRECTION          TIME            LENGTH
      -------------        ---------          ----            ------ 
      
      IAM                  SENT            0: 0: 2: 3            29
      
      85014040007000010020000B03020604019010620A0603132552000000      
                                                                      
      
      SAM                  SENT            0: 0: 2: 4            13
      
      85014040007000020200028002                                      
                                                                      
      
      SAM                  SENT            0: 0: 2: 6            13
      
      85014040007000020200028005                                      
                                                                      
      
      SAM                  SENT            0: 0: 3: 1            13
      
      85014040007000020200028007                                      
                                                                      
      
      SAM                  SENT            0: 0: 3: 4            13
      
      85014040007000020200028002                                      
                                                                      
      
      SAM                  SENT            0: 0: 3: 8            13
      
      85014040007000020200028009                                      
                                                                      
      
      ACM                  RECEIVED        0: 0: 4: 1            15
      
      850141000070000616040129010100                                  
                                                                      
      
      ANM                  RECEIVED        0: 0:14: 6            18
      
      8501410000700009012D02000039022DC000                            
                                                                      
      
      SUS                  RECEIVED        0: 0:45: 4            10
      
      850141000070000D0100                                            
                                                                      
      
      REL                  SENT            0: 0:46: 1            13
      
      850140400070000C020002849F                                      
                                                                      
      
      RLC                  RECEIVED        0: 0:46: 3             9
      
      850141000070001000                                              
                                                                      
      UNSOLICITED REPORT   NO = 00121

== Cause codes ==
Release cause codes are used to identify and debug any events occurring in ISDN User Part signaling. Every event in ISUP signaling generates a cause code number. Even for a normal ISUP call, a cause code is generated. There are lot of applications developed based on the cause code from ISUP signaling. Similarly Telecom operators trace for Causecodes to debug any call failures.

Following are the list of cause codes used. Cause codes only defined by number are effectively undefined, and may be used for proprietary solutions.

1. Unallocated (unassigned) number
2. No route to specific transit network
3. No route to destination
4. Send special info tone
5. Misdialed trunk prefix
6. Channel unacceptable
7. Call awarded and being delivered in established channel
8. Preemption
9. Preemption – circuit reserved for reuse
10. 10
11. 11
12. 12
13. Suspend
14. Resume
15. 15
16. Normal call clearing
17. User busy
18. No user responding
19. No answer from user (user alerted)
20. Subscriber absent
21. Call rejected
22. Number changed
23. Redirect to new destination (unallocated destination number ANSI)
24. Unknown business group (ANSI)
25. Exchange routing error (ANSI)
26. Non-selected user clearing
27. Destination out of order
28. Invalid number format
29. Facility rejected
30. Response to STATUS ENQUIRY
31. Normal, unspecified
32. 32
33. 33
34. No circuit/channel available
35. 35
36. 36
37. 37
38. Network out of order
39. Permanent frame mode connection out of service
40. Permanent frame mode connection operational
41. Temporary failure
42. Switching equipment congestion
43. Access information discarded
44. Requested channel/circuit not available
45. Preemption (ANSI)
46. Precedence call blocked
47. Resources unavailable, unspecified
48. 48
49. Quality of service unavailable
50. Requested facility not subscribed
51. Call type incompatible with service request (ANSI)
52. 52
53. Outgoing calls barred within CUG
54. Call blocked due to group restrictions (ANSI)
55. Incoming calls barred within CUG
56. 56
57. Bearer capability not authorized
58. Bearer capability not presently available
59. 59
60. 60
61. 61
62. Inconsistency in designed outgoing access information and subscriber class
63. Service or option not available, unspecified
64. 64
65. Bearer capability not implemented
66. Channel type not implemented
67. 67
68. 68
69. Requested facility not implemented
70. Only restricted digital bearer capability is available
71. 71
72. 72
73. 73
74. 74
75. 75
76. 76
77. 77
78. 78
79. Service or option not implemented, unspecified
80. 80
81. Invalid call reference value
82. Identified channel does not exist
83. A suspended call exists, but this call identity does not
84. Call identity in use
85. No call suspended
86. Call having the requested call identity has been cleared
87. User not member of CUG
88. Incompatible destination
89. 89
90. Non-existing CUG
91. Invalid transit network selection
92. 92
93. 93
94. 94
95. Invalid message, unspecified
96. Mandatory information element is missing
97. Message type non-existing or not implemented
98. Message incompatible with call state or message type non-existent or not implemented
99. Information element non-existent or not implemented
100. Invalid information element contents
101. Message not compatible with call state
102. Recovery on timer expiry
103. Parameter non-existent or not implemented - passed on
104. 104
105. 105
106. 106
107. 107
108. 108
109. 109
110. Message with unrecognized parameter discarded
111. Protocol error, unspecified
112. 112
113. 113
114. 114
115. 115
116. 116
117. 117
118. 118
119. 119
120. 120
121. 121
122. 122
123. 123
124. 124
125. 125
126. 126
127. Interworking, unspecified.

== Message format ==
8	7	6	5	4	3	2	1
Routing Label...
CIC Least Significant 8 Bits
Padding				CIC Most Sig. 4 Bits
Message type
Mandatory fixed part...
Mandatory variable part...
Optional part...

The Signalling Information Field (SIF) for all ISUP Message Signal Units (MSU) contain the following components:

- Routing Label
- Circuit Identification Code
- Message Type
- Mandatory Fixed Part
- Mandatory Variable Part
- Optional Part

The Routing Label indicates the Point Codes of the originating and destination nodes in the network; it also includes the Signalling Link Selection field that is used to select between the multiple routes an MSU could take between two nodes.

The Circuit Identification Code is used to specify which trunk between two switches is used to carry a particular call. Note that some versions of ANSI ISUP permit a CIC with 14 significant bits instead of the 12 that are shown.

1. The Message Type indicates the ISUP message type. The presence and form of the remaining 3 components are determined by this message type.
2. The Mandatory fixed part, when present, contains the mandatory, fixed-length parameters associated with the message type.
3. The Mandatory variable part, when present, contains the mandatory, variable-length parameters associated with the message type.
4. The Optional part, when present, contains the optional parameters permitted to be included in the message type.

When sent using the services of the Signalling Connection Control Part, ISUP messages passed to SCCP in the User Data parameter (NSDU) consist of only the last 4 components (Message Type, Mandatory fixed part, Mandatory variable part, Optional part). The routing label and circuit identification code are not included in the user data passed to SCCP.

== See also ==
- Integrated Services Digital Network (ISDN)
- Q.931 Cause Codes
