= Signalling System No. 7 =

Set of telephony signaling protocols

Q.700 series
- Signaling System No. 7
- Status: In force
- Year started: 1984
- Latest version: (03/93); March 1993
- Organization: ITU-T
- Committee: Study Group XI, WTSC
- Related standards: Q.701, Q.711
- Domain: telephony
- Website: https://www.itu.int/rec/T-REC-Q.700

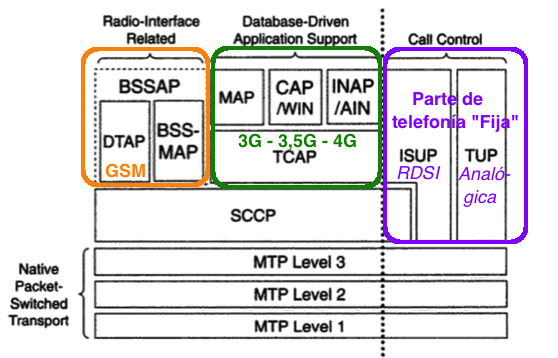
Description of the SS7/Sigtran protocol stack

Signalling System No. 7 (SS7) is a set of telephony signaling protocols developed in the 1970s that is used to setup and teardown telephone calls on most parts of the global public switched telephone network (PSTN). The protocol also performs number translation, local number portability, prepaid billing, Short Message Service (SMS), and other services.

The protocol was introduced in the Bell System in the United States by the name Common Channel Interoffice Signaling in the 1970s for signaling between No. 4ESS switch and No. 4A crossbar toll offices. The SS7 protocol is defined for international use by the Q.700-series recommendations of 1988 by the ITU-T. Of the many national variants of the SS7 protocols, most are based on variants standardized by the American National Standards Institute (ANSI) and the European Telecommunications Standards Institute (ETSI). National variants with striking characteristics are the Chinese and Japanese Telecommunication Technology Committee (TTC) national variants.

SS7 has been shown to have several security vulnerabilities, allowing location tracking of callers, interception of voice data, intercept two-factor authentication keys, and possibly the delivery of spyware to phones.

The Internet Engineering Task Force (IETF) has defined the SIGTRAN protocol suite that implements levels 2, 3, and 4 protocols compatible with SS7. Sometimes also called Pseudo SS7, it is layered on the Stream Control Transmission Protocol (SCTP) transport mechanism for use on Internet Protocol networks, such as the Internet.

In North America, SS7 is also often referred to as Common Channel Signaling System 7 (CCSS7) (or CCS7). In the United Kingdom, it is called C7 (CCITT number 7), number 7 and Common Channel Interoffice Signaling 7 (CCIS7). In Germany, it is often called Zentraler Zeichengabekanal Nummer 7 (ZZK-7).

== History ==
Signaling System No. 5 and earlier systems use in-band signaling, in which the call-setup information is sent by generating special multi-frequency tones transmitted on the telephone line audio channels, also known as bearer channels. Since the bearer channels are directly accessible by users, they can be exploited with devices such as the blue box, which can replicate the tones used by the network for call control and routing. As a remedy, SS6 and SS7 implements out-of-band signaling, carried in a separate signaling channel, thus keeping the call control and speech paths separate. SS6 and SS7 are referred to as common-channel signaling (CCS) protocols, or Common Channel Interoffice Signaling (CCIS) systems.

Another element of in-band signaling addressed by SS7 is network efficiency. With in-band signaling, the voice channel is used during call setup which makes it unavailable for actual traffic. For long-distance calls, the talk path may traverse several nodes which reduces usable node capacity. With SS7, the connection is not established between the end points until all nodes on the path confirm availability. If the far end is busy, the caller gets a busy signal without consuming a voice channel.

Since 1975, CCS protocols have been developed by major telephone companies and the International Telecommunication Union Telecommunication Standardization Sector (ITU-T); in 1977 the ITU-T defined the first international CCS protocol as Signaling System No. 6 (SS6). In its 1980 Yellow Book Q.7XX-series recommendations ITU-T defined the Signaling System No. 7 as an international standard. SS7 replaced SS6 with its restricted 28-bit signal unit that was both limited in function and not amenable to digital systems. SS7 also replaced Signaling System No. 5 (SS5), while R1 and R2 variants are still used in numerous countries.

The Internet Engineering Task Force (IETF) defined SIGTRAN protocols which translate the common channel signaling paradigm to the IP Message Transfer Part (MTP) level 2 (M2UA and M2PA), Message Transfer Part (MTP) level 3 (M3UA) and Signaling Connection Control Part (SCCP) (SUA). While running on a transport based upon IP, the SIGTRAN protocols are not an SS7 variant, but simply transport existing national and international variants of SS7.

== Functionality ==
Signaling in telephony is the exchange of control information associated with the setup and release of a telephone call on a telecommunication circuit. Examples of control information are the digits dialed by the caller and the caller's billing number.

When signaling is performed on the same circuit as the conversation of the call, it is termed channel-associated signaling (CAS). This is the case for analogue trunks, multi-frequency (MF) and R2 digital trunks, and DSS1/DASS PBX trunks.

In contrast, SS7 uses common channel signaling, in which the path and facility used by the signaling is separate and distinct from the signaling without first seizing a voice channel, leading to significant savings and performance increases in both signaling and channel usage.

Because of the mechanisms in use by signaling methods prior to SS7 (battery reversal, multi-frequency digit outpulsing, A- and B-bit signaling), these earlier methods cannot communicate much signaling information. Usually only the dialed digits are signaled during call setup. For charged calls, dialed digits and charge number digits are outpulsed. SS7, being a high-speed and high-performance packet-based communications protocol, can communicate significant amounts of information when setting up a call, during the call, and at the end of the call. This permits rich call-related services to be developed. Some of the first such services were call management related, call forwarding (busy and no answer), voice mail, call waiting, conference calling, calling name and number display, call screening, malicious caller identification, busy callback.

The earliest deployed upper-layer protocols in the SS7 suite were dedicated to the setup, maintenance, and release of telephone calls. The Telephone User Part (TUP) was adopted in Europe and the Integrated Services Digital Network (ISDN) User Part (ISUP) adapted for public switched telephone network (PSTN) calls was adopted in North America. ISUP was later used in Europe when the European networks upgraded to the ISDN. As of 2020 North America has not accomplished full upgrade to the ISDN, and the predominant telephone service is still Plain Old Telephone Service. Due to its richness and the need for an out-of-band channel for its operation, SS7 is mostly used for signaling between telephone switches and not for signaling between local exchanges and customer-premises equipment.

Because SS7 signaling does not require seizure of a channel for a conversation prior to the exchange of control information, non-facility associated signaling (NFAS) became possible. NFAS is signaling that is not directly associated with the path that a conversation will traverse and may concern other information located at a centralized database such as service subscription, feature activation, and service logic. This makes possible a set of network-based services that do not rely upon the call being routed to a particular subscription switch at which service logic would be executed, but permits service logic to be distributed throughout the telephone network and executed more expediently at originating switches far in advance of call routing. It also permits the subscriber increased mobility due to the decoupling of service logic from the subscription switch. Another ISUP characteristic SS7 with NFAS enables is the exchange of signaling information during the middle of a call.

SS7 also enables Non-Call-Associated Signaling, which is signaling not directly related to establishing a telephone call. This includes the exchange of registration information used between a mobile telephone and a home location register database, which tracks the location of the mobile. Other examples include Intelligent Network and local number portability databases.

=== Signaling modes ===
Apart from signaling with these various degrees of association with call set-up and the facilities used to carry calls, SS7 is designed to operate in two modes: associated mode and quasi-associated mode.

When operating in the associated mode, SS7 signaling progresses from switch to switch through the Public Switched Telephone Network following the same path as the associated facilities that carry the telephone call. This mode is more economical for small networks. The associated mode of signaling is not the predominant choice of modes in North America.

When operating in the quasi-associated mode, SS7 signaling progresses from the originating switch to the terminating switch, following a path through a separate SS7 signaling network composed of signal transfer points. This mode is more economical for large networks with lightly loaded signaling links. The quasi-associated mode of signaling is the predominant choice of modes in North America.

== Physical network ==
SS7 separates signaling from the voice circuits. An SS7 network must be made up of SS7-capable equipment from end to end in order to provide its full functionality. The network can be made up of several link types (A, B, C, D, E, and F) and three signaling nodes – Service Switching Points (SSPs), Signal Transfer Points (STPs), and Service Control Points (SCPs). Each node is identified on the network by a number, a signaling point code. Extended services are provided by a database interface at the SCP level using the SS7 network.

The links between nodes are full-duplex 56, 64, 1,536, or 1,984 kbit/s graded communications channels. In Europe they are usually one (64 kbit/s) or all (1,984 kbit/s) timeslots (DS0s) within an E1 facility; in North America one (56 or 64 kbit/s) or all (1,536 kbit/s) timeslots (DS0As or DS0s) within a T1 facility. One or more signaling links can be connected to the same two endpoints that together form a signaling link set. Signaling links are added to link sets to increase the signaling capacity of the link set.

In Europe, SS7 links normally are directly connected between switching exchanges using F-links. This direct connection is called associated signaling. In North America, SS7 links are normally indirectly connected between switching exchanges using an intervening network of STPs (Signaling Transfer Points). This indirect connection is called quasi-associated signaling, which reduces the number of SS7 links necessary to interconnect all switching exchanges and SCPs in an SS7 signaling network.

SS7 links at higher signaling capacity (1.536 and 1.984 Mbit/s, simply referred to as the 1.5 Mbit/s and 2.0 Mbit/s rates) are called high-speed links (HSL) in contrast to the low speed (56 and 64 kbit/s) links. High-speed links are specified in ITU-T Recommendation Q.703 for the 1.5 Mbit/s and 2.0 Mbit/s rates, and ANSI Standard T1.111.3 for the 1.536 Mbit/s rate. There are differences between the specifications for the 1.5 Mbit/s rate. High-speed links utilize the entire bandwidth of a T1 (1.536 Mbit/s) or E1 (1.984 Mbit/s) transmission facility for the transport of SS7 signaling messages.

SIGTRAN provides signaling using SCTP associations over the Internet Protocol. The protocols for SIGTRAN are M2PA, M2UA, M3UA and SUA.

== SS7 protocol suite ==
SS7 protocol suite
- SS7 protocols by OSI layer
- Application: INAP, MAP, IS-41... TCAP, CAP, ISUP, ...
- Network: MTP Level 3 + SCCP
- Data link: MTP Level 2
- Physical: MTP Level 1

The SS7 protocol stack may be partially mapped to the OSI Model of a packetized digital protocol stack. OSI layers 1 to 3 are provided by the Message Transfer Part (MTP) and the Signaling Connection Control Part (SCCP) of the SS7 protocol (together referred to as the Network Service Part (NSP)); for circuit related signaling, such as the BT IUP, Telephone User Part (TUP), or the ISDN User Part (ISUP), the User Part provides layer 7. Currently there are no protocol components that provide OSI layers 4 through 6. The Transaction Capabilities Application Part (TCAP) is the primary SCCP User in the Core Network, using SCCP in connectionless mode. SCCP in connection oriented mode provides transport layer for air interface protocols such as BSSAP and RANAP. TCAP provides transaction capabilities to its Users (TC-Users), such as the Mobile Application Part, the Intelligent Network Application Part and the CAMEL Application Part.

The Message Transfer Part (MTP) covers a portion of the functions of the OSI network layer including: network interface, information transfer, message handling and routing to the higher levels. Signaling Connection Control Part (SCCP) is at functional Level 4. Together with MTP Level 3 it is called the Network Service Part (NSP). SCCP completes the functions of the OSI network layer: end-to-end addressing and routing, connectionless messages (UDTs), and management services for users of the Network Service Part (NSP). Telephone User Part (TUP) is a link-by-link signaling system used to connect calls. ISUP is the key user part, providing a circuit-based protocol to establish, maintain, and end the connections for calls. Transaction Capabilities Application Part (TCAP) is used to create database queries and invoke advanced network functionality, or links to Intelligent Network Application Part (INAP) for intelligent networks, or Mobile Application Part (MAP) for mobile services.

=== BSSAP ===
BSS Application Part (BSSAP) is a protocol in SS7 used by the Mobile Switching Center (MSC) and the Base station subsystem (BSS) to communicate with each other using signaling messages supported by the MTP and connection-oriented services of the SCCP. For each active mobile equipment one signaling connection is used by BSSAP having at least one active transactions for the transfer of messages.

BSSAP provides two kinds of functions:

- The BSS Mobile Application Part (BSSMAP) supports procedures to facilitate communication between the MSC and the BSS pertaining to resource management and handover control.
- The Direct Transfer Application Part (DTAP) is used for transfer of those messages which need to travel directly to mobile equipment from MSC bypassing any interpretation by BSS. These messages are generally pertaining to mobility management (MM) or call management (CM).

== Protocol security vulnerabilities ==
In 2008, several SS7 vulnerabilities were published that permitted the tracking of mobile phone users.

In 2014, the media reported a protocol vulnerability of SS7 by which anyone can track the movements of mobile phone users from virtually anywhere in the world with a success rate of approximately 70%. In addition, eavesdropping is possible by using the protocol to forward calls and also facilitate decryption by requesting that each caller's carrier release a temporary encryption key to unlock the communication after it has been recorded. The software tool SnoopSnitch can warn when certain SS7 attacks occur against a phone, and detect IMSI-catchers that allow call interception and other activities.

In February 2016, 30% of the network of the largest mobile operator in Norway, Telenor, became unstable due to "unusual SS7 signaling from another European operator".

The security vulnerabilities of SS7 have been highlighted in U.S. governmental bodies, for example when in April 2016 Congressman Ted Lieu called for an oversight committee investigation.

In May 2017, O2 Telefónica, a German mobile service provider, confirmed that the SS7 vulnerabilities had been exploited to bypass two-factor authentication to achieve unauthorized withdrawals from bank accounts. The perpetrators installed malware on compromised computers, allowing them to collect online banking account credentials and telephone numbers. They set up redirects for the victims' telephone numbers to telephone lines controlled by them. Confirmation calls and SMS text messages of two-factor authentication procedures were routed to telephone numbers controlled by the attackers. This enabled them to log into victims' online bank accounts and effect money transfers.

In March 2018, a method was published for the detection of the vulnerabilities, through the use of open-source monitoring software such as Wireshark and Snort. The nature of SS7 normally being used between consenting network operators on dedicated links means that any bad actor's traffic can be traced to its source.

An investigation by The Guardian and the Bureau of Investigative Journalism revealed that the SS7 protocol was exploited in an attempt to locate Sheikha Latifa bint Mohammed Al Maktoum (II) on 3 March 2018, a day before her abduction.

In 2024, Kevin Briggs, an official at the Cybersecurity and Infrastructure Security Agency, reported to the FCC that hacks related to SS7 and Diameter had been used in "numerous attempts" to acquire location data, voice and text messages; to deliver spyware; and to influence voters in the US. In December 2024, U.S. senator Ron Wyden released information showing that the United States Department of Homeland Security believes China, Russia, Iran, and Israel are the primary countries exploiting SS7 for espionage. Similar reports were made by POST Luxembourg.

In July 2026, the Financial Times reported that the Iranian government exploited security vulnerabilities in SS7 to locate US military personnel during the 2026 Iran war. TechCrunch commented that the protocol abused by intelligence agencies for years.

== See also ==
- SS7 probe
- Out-of-band data
- Signaling System No. 5
- Signaling System No. 6
