= Transaction Capabilities Application Part =

SS7 protocol suite
- SS7 protocols by OSI layer
- Application: INAP, MAP, IS-41... TCAP, CAP, ISUP, ...
- Network: MTP Level 3 + SCCP
- Data link: MTP Level 2
- Physical: MTP Level 1

The Transaction Capabilities Application Part (TCAP) is a system used in telephone networks that lets different parts of the network communicate with each other without needing a direct call. It helps handle things like checking account information, enabling mobile roaming, and running advanced wireless services.

It is defined in ITU-T recommendations Q.771-Q.775 or ANSI T1.114 as a protocol for Signalling System 7 networks. Its primary purpose is to facilitate multiple concurrent dialogs between the same sub-systems on the same machines, using Transaction IDs to differentiate these, similar to the way TCP ports facilitate multiplexing connections between the same IP addresses on the Internet.

TCAP uses ASN.1 BER encoding, as well as the protocols it encapsulates, namely MAP in mobile phone networks or INAP in Intelligent Networks.

== Overview ==
TCAP messages are sent over the wire between machines. TCAP primitives are sent between the application and the local TCAP stack. All TCAP messages are primitives but there are primitives that are not messages. In other words, some are only transferred inside the local machine. A TCAP primitive is made up of one or more TCAP components.

An ITU-T TCAP primitive may be one of the following types:

Unidirectional	A single primitive with no subsequent primitives. Sometimes referred to as a Notice.
Begin	Start a dialog with another peer. Further primitives will follow.
Continue	Send a subsequent primitive on an existing dialog, further primitives will follow.
End	Close an existing dialog with another peer
Abort	An error has caused the dialog to close.
Cancel	The invoke timer has expired without a response being received (this is a primitive but not a message)

A Begin primitive has an Originating Transaction ID (up to 4 bytes). A Continue primitive has an Originating Transaction ID and a Destination Transaction ID. End and Abort primitives only have a Destination Transaction ID. Each primitive has both an optional component and (optional) dialogue portions. The component portion for the unidirectional primitive is mandatory.

The dialogue portion carries dialogue or unidialogue control PDUs. For MAP and INAP, dialogue PDU is used which performs establishment and release of dialogues for the application context provided in the primitives. Following primitives are defined for the dialogue PDU:

AARQ	Dialogue request. For MAP and INAP, AARQ is sent in the Begin primitive with the Invoke component in general, with the application context of MAP/INAP operation's package.
AARE	Dialogue response. Sent in response to AARQ in either Continue or End primitives.
ABRT	Dialogue abort.

Each ITU-T TCAP component may be one of the following types:

Invoke	A new operation is being requested, this may or may not solicit a response
Return Result Last	A final response to an Invoke
Return Result Not Last	A response to an Invoke, further responses will be sent
Return Error	An error occurred
Reject	Component is rejected for some reason like duplicate invocation, unrecognized linked id, unrecognized operation or mistyped argument

Invoke components have a signed 7 bit InvokeID which is present in all the other components to identify which invoke they relate to.

TCAP is based on the OSI defined ROSE, Remote Operations Services Element protocol.

== Transaction ID ==
The transaction ID is a TCAP reference for a set of TCAP operations that are performed within a single dialog. When machine A starts a TCAP dialog with another machine B, A sends a Begin message to B. This Begin message contains an Originating Transaction ID, which is the Transaction ID reference for A. When machine B replies to A with a Continue message, it includes A's Transaction ID as the Destination Transaction ID. Furthermore, B includes its own Transaction ID as the Originating Transaction ID.

As the TCAP dialog goes on, each Continue message includes the Transaction ID of the destination machine as the Destination Transaction ID and the Transaction ID of the originating machine as the Originating Transaction ID. When either machine wants to close the dialog, it sends an End message or an Abort message to the other machine. This message contains the Destination Transaction ID only.

== Invoke ID ==
Invoke ID is a TCAP reference for a specific TCAP operation and must be unique within a dialog.

== Decoded TCAP Message ==
This is a MO-SMS sent by a MAP layer and the hex stream is taken from TCAP layer.

  62 74 48 04 00 02 00 30 6B 1A 28 18 06 07 00 11 86 05 01 01 01 A0 0D 60 0B A1 09 06 07 04 00 00
  01 00 19 02 6C 50 A1 4E 02 01 01 02 01 2E 30 46 80 05 70 31 42 44 44 84 06 A1 70 91 92 55 55 04
  35 2F 09 00 70 97 92 62 23 04 00 90 20 11 80 01 24 00 27 43 50 7A 0E A2 A3 CB 20 71 79 4E 07 B1
  C3 EE 73 3D 7C 2E 83 D2 20 74 D8 5E 06 95 ED 65 39 68 5E 2E BB 01 00

According to tag length values, this can be decoded as below.

      '--> 62|74  <- Start of Tcap begin message
             |
             '--> 48|04:00 02 00 30    <- Transaction ID
             |
             '--> 6B|1A   <- Start of Dialog  portion 
                    |
                    '--> 28|18
                           |
                           '--> 06|07:00 11 86 05 01 01 01 
                           |
                           '--> A0|0D
                                  |
                                  '--> 60|0B
                                         |
                                         '--> A1|09
                                                |
                                                '--> 06|07:04 00 00 01 00 19 02   <- Application context
             |
             '--> 6C|50     <- Start of component portion
                    |
                    '--> A1|4E
                           |
                           '--> 02|01:01    <- Component Id (invoke id)
                           |
                           '--> 02|01:2E    <- Operation Code
                           |
                           '--> 30|46       <- Start of parameter buffer
                                  |
                                  '--> 80|05:70 31 42 44 44        <- SM-RP-DA(BCD)
                                  |
                                  '--> 84|06:A1 70 91 92 55 55     <- SM-RP-OA(BCD)
                                  |
                                  '--> 04|35:2F 09 00 70 97 92 62 23 04 00 90 20 11 80 01 24 00 27 43 50 7A 0E A2 A3 CB 20 71 79 4E 07 B1 C3 EE 73 3D 7C 2E 83 D2 20 74 D8 5E 06 95 ED 65 39 68 5E 2E BB 01   <- SM-RP-UI
