= Mobile Application Part =

SS7 protocol

The Mobile Application Part (MAP) is an SS7 protocol that provides an application layer for the various nodes in GSM and UMTS mobile core networks and GPRS core networks to communicate with each other in order to provide services to users. The Mobile Application Part is the application-layer protocol used to access the Home Location Register, Visitor Location Register, Mobile Switching Center, Equipment Identity Register, Authentication Centre, Short message service center and Serving GPRS Support Node (SGSN).

== Facilities provided ==
The primary facilities provided by MAP are:

- Mobility Services: location management (to support roaming), authentication, managing service subscription information, fault recovery,
- Operation and Maintenance: subscriber tracing, retrieving a subscriber's IMSI
- Call Handling: routing, managing calls whilst roaming, checking that a subscriber is available to receive calls
- Supplementary Services
- Short Message Service
- Packet Data Protocol (PDP) services for GPRS: providing routing information for GPRS connections
- Location Service Management Services: obtaining the location of subscriber

== Published specification ==
The Mobile Application Part specifications were initially developed in CCITT and subsequently adopted and further developed within CEPT, notably by its GSM group and the SPS/SIG working group. They are now maintained by ETSI/3GPP.

MAP is defined by two different standards, depending upon the mobile network type:

- MAP for GSM (prior to Release 4) is specified by 3GPP TS 09.02 (MAP v1, MAP v2)
- MAP for UMTS ("3G") and GSM (Release 99 and later) is specified by 3GPP TS 29.002 (MAP v3)

In cellular networks based on ANSI standards (in the past CDMA2000, AMPS, IS-136 and cdmaOne) plays the role of the MAP a similar protocol usually called IS-41 or ANSI-41 (ANSI MAP). Since 2000 it is maintained by 3GPP2 as N.S0005 and since 2004 it is named 3GPP2 X.S0004.

== Implementation ==
MAP is a Transaction Capabilities Application Part (TCAP) user, and as such can be transported using 'traditional' SS7 protocols or over IP using Transport Independent Signalling Connection Control Part (TI-SCCP); or using SIGTRAN.

Yate is a partial open source implementation of MAP.

== MAP signaling ==
In mobile cellular telephony networks like GSM and UMTS the SS7 application MAP is used. Voice connections are Circuit Switched (CS) and data connections are Packet Switched (PS) applications.

Some of the GSM/UMTS Circuit Switched interfaces in the Mobile Switching Center (MSC) transported over SS7 include the following:

- B -> VLR (uses MAP/B). Most MSCs are associated with a Visitor Location Register (VLR), making the B interface "internal".
- C -> HLR (uses MAP/C) Messages between MSC to HLR handled by C Interface
- D -> HLR (uses MAP/D) for attaching to the CS network and location update
- E -> MSC (uses MAP/E) for inter-MSC handover
- F -> EIR (uses MAP/F) for equipment identity check
- H -> SMS-G (uses MAP/H) for Short Message Service (SMS) over CS
- I -> ME (uses MAP/I) Messages between MSC to ME handled by I Interface
- J -> SCF (uses MAP/J) Messages between HLR to gsmSCF handled by J Interface

There are also several GSM/UMTS PS interfaces in the Serving GPRS Support Node (SGSN) transported over SS7:

- Gr -> HLR for attaching to the PS network and location update
- Gd -> SMS-C for SMS over PS
- Gs -> MSC for combined CS+PS signaling over PS
- Ge -> Charging for Customised Applications for Mobile networks Enhanced Logic (CAMEL) prepaid charging
- Gf -> EIR for equipment identity check
