= DSS =

DSS may refer to:

== Science and technology ==
=== Biology and medicine ===
- Dejerine Sottas syndrome, genetic disorder a.k.a. Charcot-Marie-Tooth disease, type 3
- Dengue shock syndrome
- Disease-specific survival
- Dextran sulphate sodium, a chemical used experimentally to induce colitis in rodents
- Dioctyl sodium sulfosuccinate, a lubricant, laxative, and pesticide
- Dimethyl-silapentane-sulfonate, chemical compound used in spectroscopy for calibration
- Disuccinimidyl suberate, a biochemical tool used as protein cross-linking agent

=== Technology ===
- Deep Space Station, an antenna station in any of Deep Space Communication Complexes, part of the Deep Space Network.
- Digital Satellite Service, digital satellite television transmission system used by DirecTV
- Digitized Sky Survey, a digital version of several photographic atlases of the night sky
- Direct-Sequence Spreading, another term for direct-sequence spread spectrum
- Drahtseilbahn Schwyz–Stoos, funicular railway in Switzerland
- Dynamic Spectrum Sharing, at technique for the coexistence of 4G and 5G mobile standards.

==== Computing ====
- Darwin Streaming Server, the open source equivalent of QuickTime Streaming Server
- Decision support system, information system that supports business or organizational decision-making activities
- Digital Signature Services, OASIS standard XML-based request/response protocols
- Digital Signature Standard, which uses the Digital Signature Algorithm
- Digital Speech Standard, a format of audio file
- Digital Subscriber System ISDN, signalling standards:
  - Digital Subscriber System No. 1, a digital signalling protocol (D channel protocol) used for the ISDN
  - Digital Subscriber System No. 2, as the successor to DSS1, is also a digital signalling protocol (D channel protocol) used for the B-ISDN

== Government and politics ==
=== Australia ===
- Department of Services and Supply, a former South Australian (state) government agency
- Department of Social Security (Australia), defunct federal governmental agency in Australia
- Department of Social Services (Australia), a federal government department in Australia

=== United States ===
- Defense Security Service, an agency in the U.S. Department of Defense
- Department of Social Services, another name for Child Protective Services, a government agency in several states
- Diplomatic Security Service, an agency in the U.S. Department of State
- Director of Selective Service of the Selective Service System, as in the widely used "Draft Card" in the U.S. during World War II, officially known as DSS Form 1 Registration Card
- Domestic Security Section, part of the Criminal Division of the U.S. Department of Justice

=== Elsewhere ===
- Democratic Party of Serbia (Demokratska stranka Srbije), a political party in Serbia
- Democratic Serb Party (Montenegro) (Demokratska Srpska stranka), a political party in Montenegro
- Department of Social Security (United Kingdom), defunct governmental agency in the United Kingdom
- Department of State Security (Romania) (Securitate) secret police and the main repressive force in communist Romania
- Sigurimi (Drejtoria e Sigurimit të Shtetit, Eng: "Directorate of State Security"), Albanian domestic security agency 1944-1991
- State Security Service (Nigeria), formerly known as State Security Service (SSS), the domestic intelligence agency of Nigeria
- United Nations Department for Safety and Security, a department of the UN dealing with the security and safety of its staff

== Schools and organizations ==
- The Dance School of Scotland, a dance school in Glasgow, Scotland - incorporated with Knightswood Secondary School
- Dansk Spejderkorps Sydslesvig, a Scout association of the Danish minority of Southern Schleswig, Germany
- Delta Secondary School (Delta, British Columbia), a school in Canada
- Dera Sacha Sauda, a non-profit social welfare and spiritual organization
- Direct Subsidy Scheme, a schooling system in Hong Kong

== Other ==
- Dead Sea Scrolls, ancient manuscripts discovered in caves on the shore of the Dead Sea
- Blaise Diagne International Airport, Diass, Senegal, by IATA code
- Design for Six Sigma (also abbreviated DFSS), a business management method
- Dizionario Storico della Svizzera, the Historical Dictionary of Switzerland (Italian)
- Duplex Stainless Steel, a steel with improved resistance to localized corrosion
- Demographic surveillance system - Periodic data collection system of a geographic area

== See also ==
- DS2 (disambiguation)
