= Digital Access Signalling System =

Digital Access Signalling System (DASS) may refer to the following ISDN protocols created by British Telecom:

- Digital Access Signalling System 1 (DASS1)
- Digital Access Signalling System 2 (DASS2)
