= VB5 =

VB5 may refer to:

- Visual Basic (classic), a programming language and programming environment
- VB5 interface, a telecommunications interface internal to Broadband ISDNs
