= Non-Facility Associated Signalling =

Telecommunications interface standard

Non-Facility Associated Signaling or NFAS is a Primary Rate Interface configuration whereby multiple T1 carriers share a signaling channel (or D channel).

A T1 circuit typically carries 24 individual timeslots. Each timeslot in turn carries a single telephone call. When a T1 circuit is used to carry Primary Rate ISDN one of the timeslots is used to carry the D channel. A single Primary Rate ISDN circuit is thus sometimes described as 23B + D. There are 23 bearer channels carrying voice or data, and one D channel carrying the Common Channel Signaling.

In an NFAS configuration, multiple T1 circuits share a single D channel, with an upper limit of 20 T1 circuits in a single NFAS configuration. A full NFAS configuration can then be described as 479B + D. There is one problem; a failure on the T1 trunk carrying the D channel will also affect all 19 other trunks. The solution is D channel backup where a second D channel is configured on another trunk. In the event of failure the backup D channel takes over the signaling. So the final configuration is 478B + D + D-backup.

NFAS is a cost-cutting measure. Customers ordering a Primary Rate ISDN service will be charged for each signaling channel. Therefore an NFAS configuration can be cheaper than Facility Associated Signaling, due to historical reasons. North American switches such as the Lucent 5ESS, and the Nortel DMS-100 did not handle common channel signaling such as ISDN on the same line card that terminated the T1 circuit. So, the telephone company needs to buy and maintain a separate signaling card for every D channel.

The situation in Europe and the rest of the world is different. A Primary Rate ISDN configurations uses E1 carriers, where each carrier has 32 timeslots. 30 of the timeslots are used to carry calls, one timeslot is used for synchronization, and one timeslot is used to carry the signaling channel. The line cards in switches designed for the E1 system already include processing for the signaling timeslot. As a result, Non-Facility Associated Signaling is rarely used with E-carrier.
