= Data over signalling =

Data over signalling (sometimes data over signaling) or DoS, is a technique in telecommunications in which primary data is sent over a signalling channel instead of the subscriber's bearer channel.

== Background ==
Data over signalling was designed as a solution to the problem of transceiving simultaneous voice and data.

Data over signalling can be utilized when the signalling channel is either channel associated or common. However, it is easier to implement when the signalling channel is channel associated, as the system does not have to demultiplex the data and signalling between multiple subscribers.

DoS was designed so that mobile telephony subscribers could maintain a voice session on their bearer channel while still accessing data related services, such as text messaging.
