= SDAP =

SDAP may refer to:

- Social Democratic Workers' Party (Netherlands), a Dutch political party founded in 1894 that later merged into the Labour Party (Netherlands)
- Social Democratic Workers' Party of Germany, a German political party founded in 1869 that later merged into the Social Democratic Party of Germany
- Social Democratic Party of Austria, an Austrian major party, founded in 1898
- Service data adaptation protocol, a protocol specified by 3GPP for the 5G networks
