= MBN =

MBN may refer to:

== Radio and television networks ==
- Maeil Broadcasting Network, cable TV network in South Korea
- Mareco Broadcasting Network, radio network in the Philippines
- Middle East Broadcasting Networks, US-based Middle East-focused media organization
- Moody Radio (Moody Broadcasting Network), radio network in the United States aimed at a Christian audience
- Mutual Black Network, radio network in the United States aimed at an African American audience

== People ==
- Michael Brandsegg-Nygård, Norwegian professional ice hockey player
- Muhammad bin Nayef, former crown prince of Saudi Arabia

== Technology ==
- MacBook Neo, a line of laptop computers by Apple Inc.

== Other uses ==
- Macaguán language (ISO 639-3: mbn), Guahiban language spoken in Colombia
- Middle Brighton railway station, Melbourne
- Mount Barnett Airport (IATA: MBN), airport serving Mount Barnett Station, Western Australia
- Multi-bearer network, type of telecommunications network which can carry a data packet via one of several alternative bearers
- Zambian Airways (ICAO: MBN), former flag carrier of Zambia

== See also ==
- MBN Explorer (MesoBioNano Explorer), software package for molecular dynamics simulations, structure optimization and kinetic Monte Carlo simulations
