= McCaw Cellular Communications =

American cellular telephone company

McCaw Cellular Communications, Inc.
- Industry: Cellular telephone
- Founded: 1966 as a cable television provider, 1986 as McCaw Cellular
- Defunct: October 1994
- Fate: Acquired
- Successor: AT&T Wireless Services
- Headquarters: Redmond, Washington
- Key people: Craig McCaw
- Products: AMPS

McCaw Cellular Communications, Inc., was a cellular telephone pioneer in the United States. Savvy licensing of cellular spectrum in the early 1980s put McCaw Cellular in an extremely strong position, quickly outpacing the growth of the "Baby Bells" in the emerging market. The company purchased MCI Communications's mobile businesses in 1986, followed by LIN Broadcasting in 1989, giving them widespread access in all of the major US markets. Partnering with AT&T as a technology provider, McCaw introduced their "Cellular One" service in 1990, the first truly national cellular system. AT&T purchased 33% of the company in 1992, and arranged a merger in 1994 that made Craig McCaw one of AT&T's largest shareholders. In 2002, the company was spun off from AT&T to become AT&T Wireless Services.

== History ==
=== McCaw Cellular Communications ===
In 1966 J. Elroy McCaw sold one of his cable television holdings in Centralia, Washington to his three sons, including Craig who was 16 years old at the time. Craig took an increasingly central role in the development of McCaw Communications, and by the early 1980s had grown the company from 2,000 subscribers to about $5 million in annual revenue.

In 1981 McCaw came across an AT&T document about the future of cellular telephony, which predicted that by the turn of the century there would be 900,000 cellular subscribers in the United States. Intrigued, McCaw found that the licenses for cellular spectrum were being sold at $4.50 per "pop", meaning he could build a base for future subscribers for very low cost. By 1983, McCaw Communications had purchased licenses in six of the 30 largest US markets. McCaw then succeeded in using the licenses and collateral, based on the AT&T projections, using that collateral to take out loans and buy more licenses, and eventually buying billions of dollars of spectrum. In 1987 he sold the cable business for $755 million, and used this new capital to buy even more cellular licenses.

It was around this time that the first wave of analog cellular telephones were starting to enter the consumer conscience. The Baby Bells started the process of buying their own licenses, only to find that McCaw owned enough of most of the major markets to lock them out unless they purchased spare licenses from him, at a huge profit. His network of licenses in the major markets was used as a lever to buy, sell or trade licenses in other markets that were not considered profitable, at a considerable discount. In 1986 the company purchased MCI's wireless operations, cellular and paging, for $122 million, and changed their name to "McCaw Cellular Communications". In 1989 the company outbid BellSouth for control of LIN Broadcasting, which owned licenses in Houston, Dallas, Los Angeles, and New York, paying $3.5 billion, a price that represented $350 per license.

=== Cellular One ===
At this point McCaw's focus turned from dealing licenses to servicing the network, signing up customers in what was now a maturing technology on the cusp of explosive growth. In order to handle the customer side of the business, McCaw turned to AT&T for technology.

In 1990, McCaw Cellular introduced SS7 signaling across their network. Prior to this, each cell tower in the network connected to local signaling, billing and sets of land-lines. Since only the towers in the area local to the customer's home had access to dialing and routing information, when they traveled to another area calls could not reach them. With the introduction of SS7 signaling, the dialing and routing information could now be switched across the entire network (known technically as Non-Facility Associated Signalling), tying it together into a single national network. They called the new system "Cellular One", and introduced the concept of roaming charges. That year, McCaw earned $54 million, making him America's highest-paid chief executive.

The partnership grew in November 1992, when AT&T purchased 1/3 of the company for $3.8 billion. At the time, the company was generating $1.75 billion in annual revenue, and had two million Cellular One subscribers - far more customers than AT&T's earlier projections for all cellular use in the US, at a point almost ten years earlier.

=== AT&T Wireless ===
In 1994 the marriage of the two companies was consummated when AT&T purchased the rest of McCaw Cellular for $11.5 billion, at that time the second largest merger in US history, second only to the RJR Nabisco takeover documented in Barbarians at the Gate. The merger was completed in late 1994, creating AT&T Wireless Group, which was at that time the largest cellular carrier in the US. As a result of the merger, Craig McCaw became one of AT&T's largest shareholders, but he refused to sit on the Board of Directors because he couldn't stand long meetings. McCaw left daily operations to focus on Teledesic, passing control of AT&T Wireless to James Barksdale, and then Steve Hooper when Barksdale left for Netscape.
