= SunComm Technology =

Taiwan computer technology manufacturer

SunComm Technology Co., Ltd. 相光科股份有限公司
- Type: Public
- Industry: Computer systems Computer hardware IT Services; Electronics
- Founded: 1977; 49 years ago as Multitech
- Headquarters: New Taipei City, Taiwan
- Area served: Worldwide
- Key people: Gary Tseng (chairman)
- Products: Ethernet hub Voice over IP; Gateways; Servers; Modem; Payphone
- Number of employees: 100
- Website: suncomm.com.tw

SunComm Technology Co. Ltd. (Chinese: 相光科股份有限公司; pinyin: Xiāngguāngkē Gǔfèn Yǒuxiàn Gōngsī) is a Taiwan multinational computer technology and GSM Voice over IP gateway manufacturer. The main products in 2010 focused on GSM VoIP gateways & IP surveillance camera devices. Core members have been engaging in the communication & networks industry since 1977.

== History ==
SunComm Technology Co., Ltd (Chinese: 相光科技)
In 1977, developed communication & networks industry.
In 2007, developed GSM gateway.
In 2008, developed VoIP.
In 2010, developed GSM to VoIP Gateway.

== Operations ==
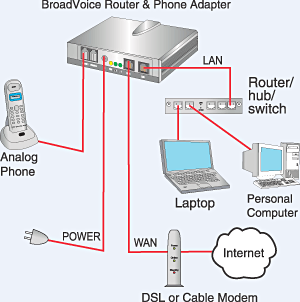

Dongguan, China Liaison Office has been set up at Guan-Dong Province to provide service from Taiwan and China.
SunComm Technology Co., Ltd provides:

- VoIP

Wifi IP Phone gateway 2, 4, 6, 8, 16, 24 ports
SIP Proxy Server for 200 users with 2, 4, 8 FXS, FXO embedded
SIP IP PBX with 72 SIP Line and 24 SIP Trunk
Web Call Server: with 10 concurrent call, 30 concurrent call

- GSM VoIP Device

GSM Gateway (FWT)
GSM VoIP gateway: 1 channel, 2 channels
GSM E1 Channel Bank (30 channels)
(Dual band 900/1800 MHz or Quad band 900/1800/1900 MHz)

== Products ==
A VoIP phone has the following hardware components:

- Keypad & touchpad to enter phone number and text.
- Speaker & earphone and microphone.
- General purpose processor (GPP) to process application messages.
- Display hardware to feedback user input and show caller-id & messages.
- A voice engine or a digital signal processor (DSP) to process RTP messages. Some IC manufacturers provides GPP and DSP in single chip.
- Ethernet or Wireless network hardware to send and receive messages on data network.
- Power source might be a battery or DC source. Some VoIP phones receive electricity from Power over Ethernet.
- ADC and DAC converters: To convert voice to digital data and vice versa.

Other devices There are several Wi-Fi enabled mobile phones and PDAs that come pre-loaded with SIP clients, or are capable of running IP telephony clients. Some VoIP phones also support PSTN phone lines directly.
Gateway devices Analog telephony adapters are connected to the internet or Local area network using an Ethernet port and have sockets to connect one or more PSTN phones. Such devices are sent out to customers who sign up with various commercial VoIP providers allowing them to continue using their existing PSTN based telephones.

Another type of gateway device acts as a simple GSM base station and regular mobile phones can connect to this and make VoIP calls. While a license is required to run one of these in most countries these can be useful on ships or remote areas where a low-powered gateway transmitting on unused frequencies is likely to go unnoticed.

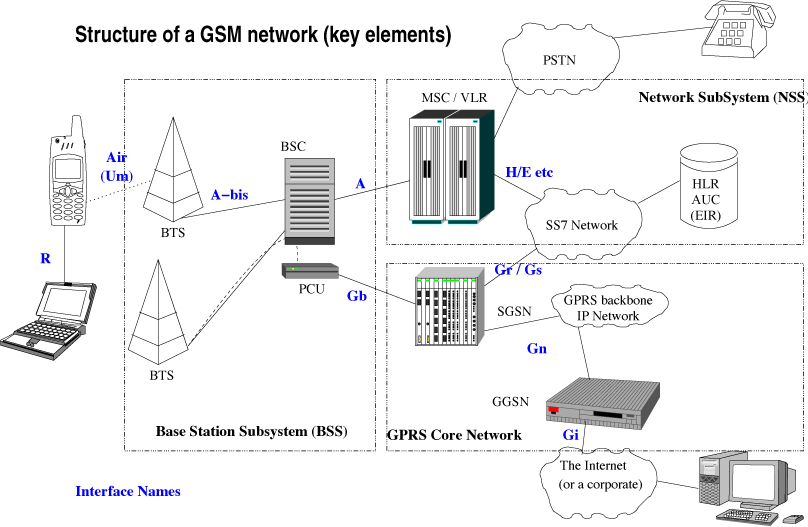

- Ethernet hub
- Voice over IP
  - E1 GSM Channel Bank with VoIP
  - GSM Fixed Phone (FWP)
  - IP Phone / Wifi IP
  - Skype Phone Desktop
- Router
  - 3G Wifi AP Router
- Gateway

  - 3G GSM Gateway
  - GSM Gateway
  - PoE Switch
- Server
  - 3G Hsupa Hsdpa EvdoEdge Modem
  - GSM Remote SIM Switch / Server
  - Wifi ATA / VoIP Gateway
- Terminal
  - 3G VoIP Terminal
  - CDMA VoIP Terminal
  - GSM VoIP Terminal
- Modem
  - GSM / Wifi Dual Mode
- Payphone

Disadvantages of VoIP phones

IP networks, particularly residential Internet connections, are easily congested. This can cause poorer voice quality or the call to be dropped completely. VoIP phones, like other network devices can be subjected to denial-of-service attacks as well as other attacks, especially if the device is given a public IP address. Due to the latency induced by protocol overhead they do not work as well on satellite Internet and other high-latency Internet connections. Requires Internet access to make calls outside the local area network (LAN) unless a compatible local PBX is available to handle calls to and from outside lines. VoIP phones and routers depend on mains electricity for power, unlike PSTN phones, which are supplied with power from the telephone exchange. However, this can be mitigated by installing a UPS.

== See also ==
- 3G(3rd-generation)
- Business telephone system (PBX)
- GSM (Global System for Mobile Communications)
- List of companies of Taiwan
- Network address translation (NAT)
- Network bridge
- Power over Ethernet (PoE)
- Session Initiation Protocol (SIP)
- Skype
- Voice over IP (Voice over Internet Protocol)
- Wi-Fi
- Wireless access point (WAP)
