= Simultaneous voice and data =

In telecommunications, a system that supports simultaneous voice and data (SVD) is one that can transceive both voice and primary data concurrently over one PSTN modem.

== Background ==
Before telecommunication networks began to support data related services, the bearer channel was dedicated solely to voice information. When support for data related services was originally released, the bearer channel was switched between being dedicated to voice information or dedicated to primary data information, depending on the subscriber's needs at any given time. Eventually, support for simultaneous voice and data transmission was added to modems and mobile devices, to enable subscribers to use voice and data services at the same time.

== Types ==
- Digital Simultaneous Voice and Data, or DSVD, defined by the ITU-T V.70 standard.
- Analog Simultaneous Voice and Data, or ASVD, defined by the ITU-T V.61 standard.
- Data over signalling, or DoS, wherein data is multiplexed onto the signalling channel and voice is dedicated to the bearer channel.
- Combined voice and data, wherein the data is multiplexed with voice onto the bearer channel.

== See also ==
- Multiplexing
- Voice activity detection
