= BS3 =

BS3 or BS-3 may refer to:

- BS3, a BS postcode area for Bristol, England
- BS3, a center drill bit size
- 100 mm field gun M1944 (BS-3), a 1944 Soviet gun
- BisSulfosuccinimidyl suberate, a crosslinker used in biological research
- Bežigrad neighbourhood number 3, a living settlement in Ljubljana, Slovenia
- B-s3, a variant of the Antonov A-1 aircraft
- BS 3, Report on Influence of Gauge Length and Section of Test Bar on the Percentage of Elongation, a British Standard
- BS-III Bharat Stage emission standards in India
- BS3, a brass right-hand threaded Gas cylinder valve

== See also ==
- BS-3A, a Yuri (satellite)
