= Multi-bearer network =

A multi-bearer network (MBN) is a network having the capability to carry a data packet via one of several alternative bearers. To be more precise, the term multi-bearer network should be interpreted as meaning 'multi-bearer-type network', or in other words, a network arrangement which provides multiple different bearer types for data packet delivery.

== Background of multi-bearer network ==
An example of a suitable MBN is a concept known as Multimedia Environment for Mobiles (MEMO). Additionally, the MBN supports mobility of a subscriber terminal. An example of terminal mobility is IP mobility, which is the topic of standard by the IETF. The problem underlying the invention is how to select the optimal bearer for each data packet in varying situations in a multi-bearer network. Data packets have different quality-of-service requirements. Situations may vary because the subscriber moves or the network load changes.

== Brief summary of multi-bearer network ==
From the patent

Accordingly, it is an object of the present invention to provide a mechanism for selecting the optimal bearer for each data packet in varying situations. The object is achieved by a method and equipment which are characterized by what is disclosed in the attached independent claims. Preferred embodiments of the invention are disclosed in the attached dependent claims. The invention is based on the idea that selecting the optimal bearer for a data packet between the MBN and the mobile node is based on a combination of

1) the quality-of-service requirement (traffic class) of the data packet in question, 2) the mobility data related to the mobile node, 3) the traffic data related to the multiple bearers, and 4) bearer preference information. The bearer preference information can be obtained from the mobile node, and optionally, from the operators of the home and visited MBN operators.

In order to save the battery of a portable mobile node, it is preferable that the mobile node only monitors one bearer type (network) at a time. For example, the subscriber data related to the mobile node can include a default bearer type, such as GSM or UMTS. The mobile node should be paged on this bearer. The mobile node can be ordered to monitor the selected bearer type by sending a modified page message which indicates the selected bearer type, channel, possible decryption data, etc. Alternatively, such information can be sent in a separate message, such as a short message, USSD, (Unstructured Supplementary Service Data), data call or the like. According to another preferred embodiment of the invention, as long as the mobile node is within a certain coverage area, all IP packets belonging to the same session (or flow if flow labels are used) are routed via the same interface unit. For example, if a mobile node is receiving IP packets from a DAB network, via a cell x, all IP packets of the same session should be routed via DAB cell x, unless the mobile node moves out of the coverage area of this cell.
