= G.165 =

G.165 is an ITU-T standard for echo cancellers. It is primarily used in telephony. Echo can occur on telephone lines when a user's voice is reflected back to them from further down the line. This can be distracting for the user and even make conversation unintelligible. Echo can also interfere with data transmission. The standard was released for usage in 1993, it was superseded by the G.168.
