= DS2 =

DS2 may refer to:

== Video games ==
- Dark Seed II, a 1995 adventure game
- Dark Souls II, a 2014 action role-playing video game
- Dead Space 2, a 2011 survival horror third-person shooter game
- Death Stranding 2: On the Beach, the sequel to Death Stranding
- Devil Summoner 2: Raidou Kuzunoha vs. King Abaddon, a 2008 action role-playing game in the Shin Megami Tensei series
- Devil Survivor 2, a 2011 strategy RPG in the Shin Megami Tensei series
- Dungeon Siege II, a 2005 action role-playing game
- Darksiders II, a 2012 action role-playing hack and slash game
- SimCity DS 2, 2008 city-building game for the Nintendo DS

== Other uses ==
- DS2 (album), a 2015 album by American rapper Future
- C-Net DS2, a 1986 bulletin board system (BBS) for the Commodore 64 microcomputer
- Datsun DS-2, a 1951 car in the Datsun DS series
- DS-2, a type of Soviet satellite including Kosmos 1
- Deep Space 2, a probe of NASA's New Millennium Program
- Design of Systems on Silicon, Powerline communication's chipset developer
- Dsquared², a fashion brand
- DualShock 2, the controller used by the PlayStation 2

== See also ==
- DSS (disambiguation)
- DSDS
- Nintendo 2DS
