= Digital Subscriber System No. 2 =

Digital Subscriber Signalling System No. 2 (DSS2), as the successor to DSS1, is also a digital signalling protocol (D channel protocol) used for the B-ISDN.
