= Drahtseilbahn Schwyz–Stoos =

Former funicular railway in the canton of Schwyz, Switzerland

Drahtseilbahn Schwyz-Stoos
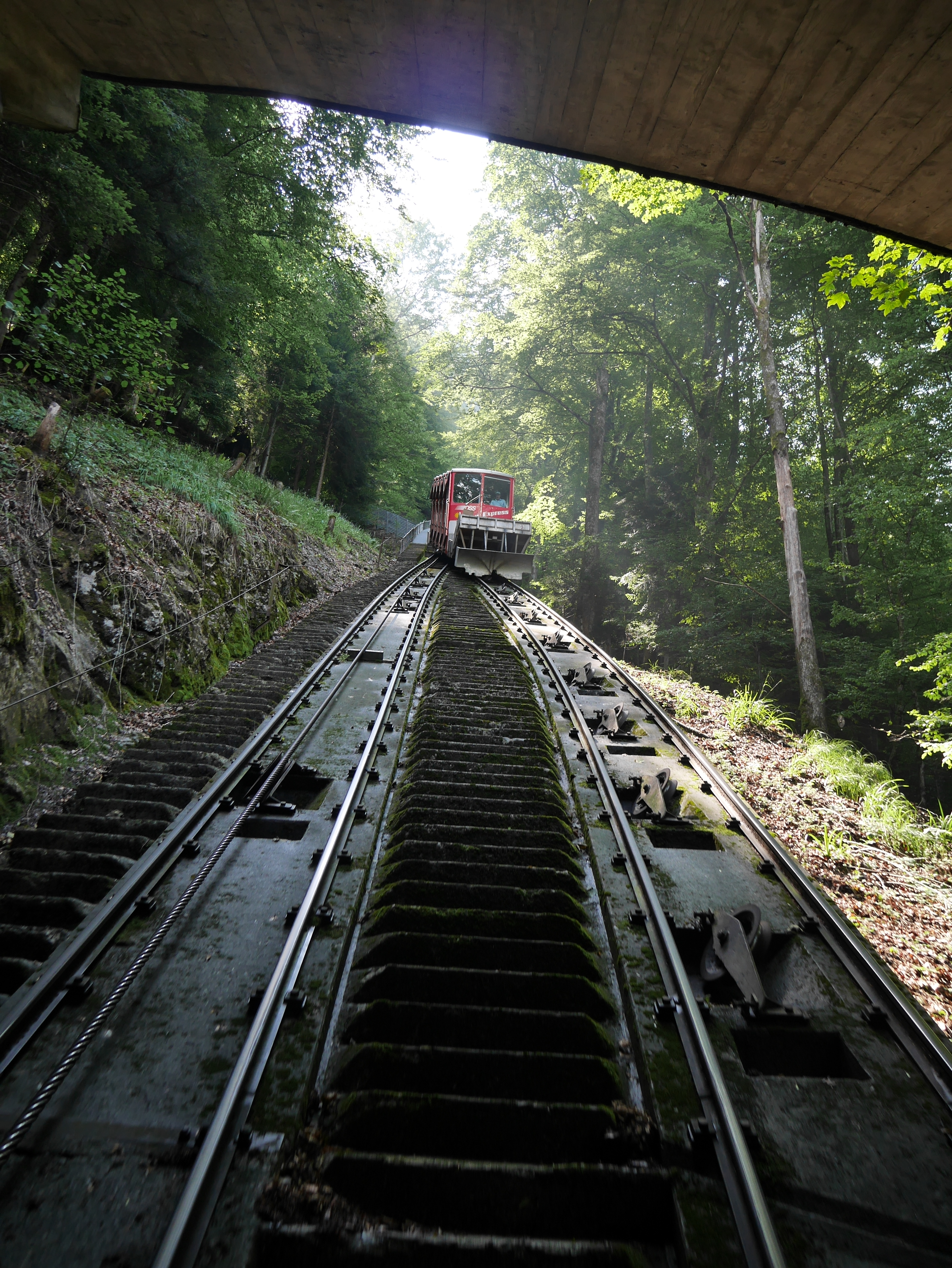
- passing loop (2015)

Overview
- Other name(s): Standseilbahn Schwyz-Stoos; Stoosbahn
- Status: ceased operation
- Owner: Stoosbahnen AG
- Locale: Canton of Schwyz
- Termini: Schlattli; Stoos

Service
- Type: funicular
- Route number: (1570)
- Rolling stock: 2 for 100 passengers each (..–2017), 2 for 50 passengers each (1933–..)

History
- Opened: 19 August 1933; 92 years ago
- Concession: 1930
- Planning for replacement: 2004
- Closed: 7 December 2017; 7 years ago

Technical
- Line length: 1,376 m (4,514 ft)
- Number of tracks: 1 with passing loop
- Track gauge: 800 mm (2 ft 7 1/2 in)
- Electrification: from opening
- Highest elevation: 1,294 m (4,245 ft)

Drahtseilbahn Schwyz–Stoos (also Stoosbahn) was a funicular railway in the canton of Schwyz, Switzerland. It led from Schlattli in the municipality of Schwyz at 569 m (1,867 ft) elevation to Stoos at 1,294 m (4,245 ft). The funicular was in use from 1933 to 2017, when it was replaced by the Stoosbahn with a different route.

The line had a length of 1,376 m (4,514 ft). (Note: notes track length of 1,383 m (4,537 ft) and line length of 1,361 m (4,465 ft)) with a maximum incline of 78%.

In 1930, the Swiss Federal Assembly granted a concession for the line. The line was opened in 1933.

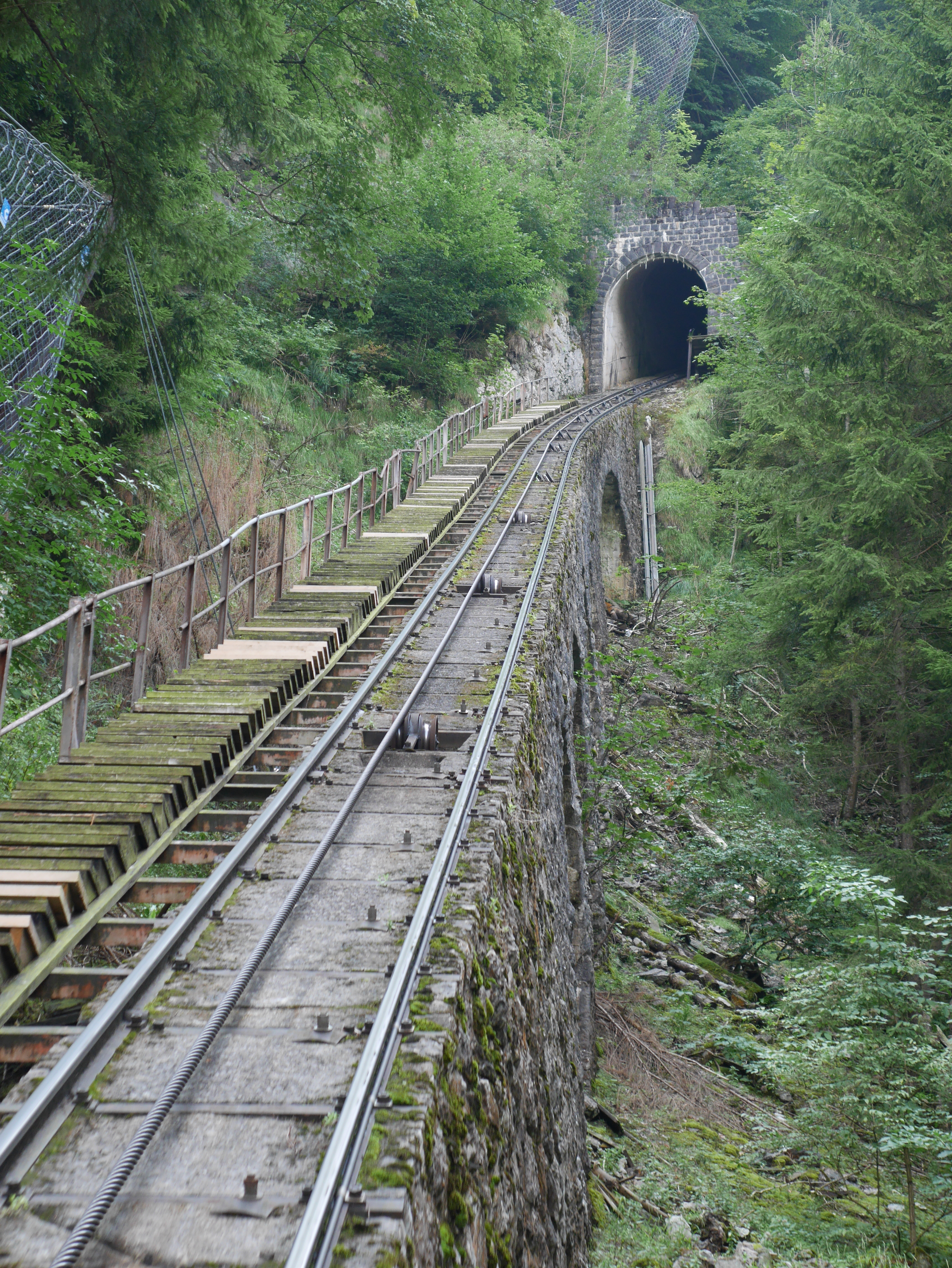
tunnel (2015)

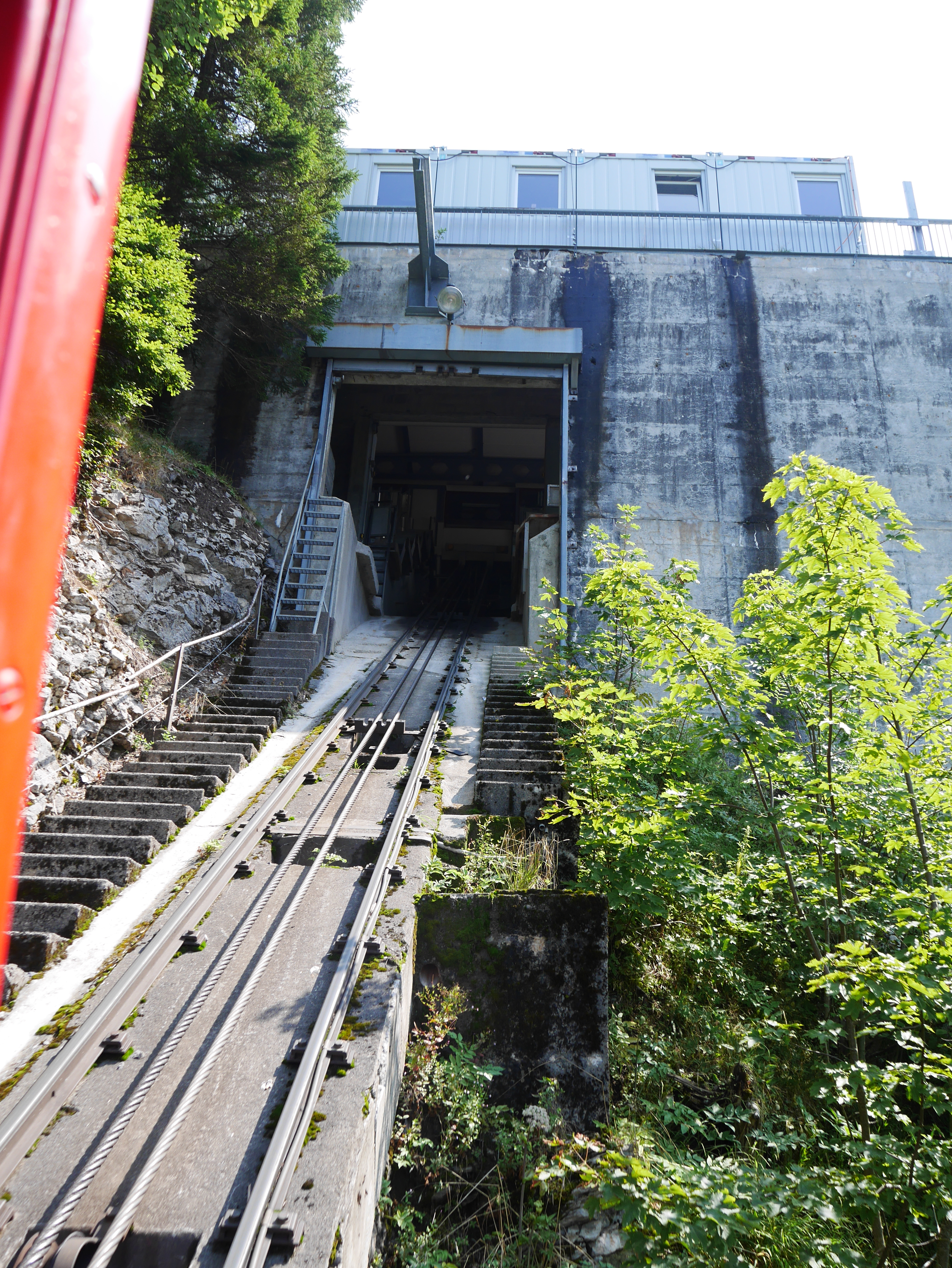
upper station (2015)
