= VB5 interface =

Telecommunications interface internal to Broadband ISDNs

VB5 is a set of protocols that define the interface between a broadband user access node and a service node. It is the broadband equivalent of the V5 interface, and is a member of the Broadband ISDN architecture.
