= Bearer Capability =

Bearer Capability in telecommunications is one of the Information Elements (fields) of the Q.931 SETUP message. It is used by the calling party to specify the type of B channel being requested.

== Description ==
For example, if a Bearer Capability of Speech is specified, the network is free to select a set of facilities that can provide this service (including, in this case, analogue trunks and routes involving echo cancellers or DCME).

If, on the other hand, a Bearer Capability of Unrestricted Digital Information is specified, the network is required to set up the call using only end-to-end digital facilities (without the use of robbed-bit signaling, echo cancellers, DCME nor A-law to mu-law conversion), or reject the call if no end-to-end digital circuit is available.

The Bearer Capability is augmented by the Higher Layer Compatibility (HLC) Information Element (another field in the Q.931 SETUP message), which informs the network of the intended use of the channel by the caller.
