= QSIG =

QSIG is an ISDN based signaling protocol for signaling between private branch exchanges (PBXs) in a private integrated services network (PISN). It makes use of the connection-level Q.931 protocol and the application-level ROSE protocol. ISDN "proper" functions as the physical link layer.

QSIG was originally developed by Ecma International, adopted by ETSI and is defined by a set of ISO standard documents, so is not owned by any company. This allows interoperability between communications platforms provided by disparate vendors.

QSIG has two layers, called BC (basic call) and GF (generic function). QSIG BC describes how to set up calls between PBXs. QSIG GF provides supplementary services for large-scale corporate, educational, and government networks, such as line identification, call intrusion and call forwarding. Thus for a large or very distributed company that requires multiple PBXs, users can receive the same services across the network and be unaware of the switch that their telephone is connected to. This greatly eases the problems of management of large networks.

QSIG will likely never rival each vendor's private network protocols, but it does provide an option for a higher level of integration than that of the traditional choices.

== List of QSIG standards ==
Note: This list is not complete. See the "source" after the list for more information.

- ECMA-143 - Private Integrated Services Network (PISN) - Circuit Mode Bearer Services - Inter-Exchange Signalling Procedures and Protocol (QSIG-BC), Basic Call,
  International and European Versions: ISO/IEC 11572, ETSI EN 300 172
- ECMA-165 - Private Integrated Services Network (PISN) - Generic Functional Protocol for the Support of Supplementary Services - Inter-Exchange Signalling Procedures and Protocol (QSIG-GF),
  International and European Versions: ISO/IEC 11582, ETSI ETS 300 239
- ECMA-164 - Private Integrated Services Network (PISN) - Inter-Exchange Signalling Protocol - Name Identification Supplementary Services (QSIG-NA),
  International and European Versions: ISO/IEC 13868, ETSI ETS 300 238
- ECMA-174 - Private Integrated Services Network (PISN) - Inter-Exchange Signalling Protocol - Call Diversion Supplementary Services (QSIG-CF),
  International and European Versions: ISO/IEC 13873, ETSI ETS 300 257
- ECMA-178 - Private Integrated Services Network (PISN) - Inter-Exchange Signalling Protocol - Call Transfer Supplementary Service (QSIG-CT),
  International and European Versions: ISO/IEC 13869, ETSI ETS 300 261

Source : ECMA - list of standards (search the list for PISN to find all QSIG related standards at ECMA)

QSIG basically uses ROSE to invoke specific supplementary service at the remote PINX. These ROSE operations are coded in a Q.931 FACILITY info element. Here a list of QSIG opcodes:

| opcode | supplServ | defining ECMA |
|---|---|---|
| 0 | callingName | ECMA-164 |
| 1 | calledName | ECMA-164 |
| 2 | connectedName | ECMA-164 |
| 3 | busyName | ECMA-164 |
| 4 | pathReplacePropose | ECMA-176 |
| 5 | pathReplaceSetup | ECMA-176 |
| 6 | pathReplaceRetain | ECMA-176 |
| 7 | callTransferIdentity | ECMA-178 |
| 8 | callTransferAbandon | ECMA-178 |
| 9 | callTransferInitiate | ECMA-178 |
| 10 | callTransferSetup | ECMA-178 |
| 11 | callTransferActive | ECMA-178 |
| 12 | callTransferComplete | ECMA-178 |
| 13 | callTransferUpdate | ECMA-178 |
| 14 | subaddressTransfer | ECMA-178 |
| 15 | activateDiversionQ | ECMA-174 |
| 16 | deactivateDiversionQ | ECMA-174 |
| 17 | interrogateDiversionQ | ECMA-174 |
| 18 | checkRestriction | ECMA-174 |
| 19 | callRerouteing | ECMA-174 |
| 20 | divertingLegInformation1 | ECMA-174 |
| 21 | divertingLegInformation2 | ECMA-174 |
| 22 | divertingLegInformation3 | ECMA-174 |
| 23 | cfnrDivertedLegFailed | ECMA-174 |
| 27 | ccnrRequest | ECMA-186 |
| 28 | ccCancel | ECMA-186 |
| 29 | ccExecPossible | ECMA-186 |
| 30 | ccPathReverse | ECMA-186 |
| 31 | ccRingout | ECMA-186 |
| 32 | ccSuspend | ECMA-186 |
| 33 | ccResume | ECMA-186 |
| 34 | callOfferRequest | ECMA-192 |
| 35 | doNotDisturbActivateQ | ECMA-194 |
| 36 | doNotDisturbDeactivateQ | ECMA-194 |
| 37 | doNotDisturbInterrogateQ | ECMA-194 |
| 38 | doNotDsturbOverrideQ | ECMA-194 |
| 39 | doNotDisturbOvrExecuteQ | ECMA-194 |
| 40 | ccbsRequest | ECMA-186 |
| 41 | pathRetain | ECMA-192 |
| 42 | serviceAvailable | ECMA-192 |
| 43 | callIntrusionRequest | ECMA-203 |
| 44 | callIntrusionGetCIPL | ECMA-203 |
| 45 | callIntrusionIsolate | ECMA-203 |
| 46 | callIntrusionForcedRelease | ECMA-203 |
| 47 | callIntrusionWOBRequest | ECMA-203 |
| 48 | callIntrusionCompleted | ECMA-203 |
| 49 | cfbOverride | ECMA-192 |
| 54 | ctmiEnquiry | ECMA-215 |
| 55 | ctmiDivert | ECMA-215 |
| 56 | ctmiInform | ECMA-215 |
| 57 | recallAlert | ECMA-214 |
| 58 | recallAnswered | ECMA-214 |
| 59 | chargeRequest | ECMA-212 |
| 60 | getFinalCharge | ECMA-212 |
| 61 | aocFinal | ECMA-212 |
| 62 | aocInterim | ECMA-212 |
| 63 | aocRate | ECMA-212 |
| 64 | aocComplete | ECMA-212 |
| 65 | aocDivChargeReq | ECMA-212 |
| 66 | cintLeginformation1 | ECMA-221 |
| 67 | cintLegInformation2 | ECMA-221 |
| 68 | cintCondition | ECMA-221 |
| 69 | cintDisable | ECMA-221 |
| 70 | cintEnable | ECMA-221 |
| 80 | mWIActivate | ECMA-242 |
| 81 | mWIDeactivate | ECMA-242 |
| 82 | mWIInterrogate | ECMA-242 |
| 84 | cmnRequest | ECMA-251 |
| 85 | cmnInform | ECMA-251 |
| 86 | pathReplaceInvite | ECMA-176 |

== List of ISDN standards ==
- ETS 300 052 - Multiple Subscriber Number
- ETS 300 055 - Call Waiting
- ETS 300 092 - Calling Line Identification Presentation (CLIP)
- ETS 300 093 - Calling Line Identification Restriction (CLIR)
- ETS 300 097 - Connected Line Identification Presentation (COLP)
- ETS 300 098 - Connected Line Identification Restriction (COLR)
- ETS 300 130 - Malicious Call Identification
- ETS 300 141 - Call Hold
- ETS 300 172 - Circuit-Mode Basic Service
- ETS 300 173 - Called/Calling Line ID Presentation
- ETS 300 182 - Advice Of Charge
- ETS 300 188 - Three Way Conference
- ETS 300 207 - Call Diversion
- ETS 300 237 - Called/Calling Name Presentation
- ETS 300 238 - Called/Calling Name Presentation
- ETS 300 239 - Generic Functional Protocol
- ETS 300 256 - CFU Supplementary Service
- ETS 300 258 - Path Replacement (ANF-PR)
- ETS 300 359 - Call Completion To Busy Subscriber (CCBS)
- ETS 300 260 - Call Transfer By Join (SS-CT)
- ETS 300 261 - Call Transfer - (SS-CT)
- ETS 300 369 - Explicit Call Transfer
- ETS 300 745 - Message Waiting Indication (MWI)
- ETS 300 259 - Path Replacement Additional Network Feature (ANF-PR)
- ETS 301 258 - Recall Supplementary Service (SS-RE)
- ETS 301 919 - Single Step Call Transfer Supplementary Service (SS-SSCT)

Source : European Telecommunications Standards Institute (ETSI)

- CCITT G.703 - Describes the physical/electrical characteristics of hierarchical digital interfaces.

Source : International Telecommunication Union (ITU)

== See also ==
- H.450
- DPNSS
