= H.450 =

International Telecommunication Union standards

H.450 refers to a set of standards created by the International Telecommunication Union (ITU) to define several Supplementary Services of the packet based telecommunication protocol known as H.323. It parallels another set of standards known as QSIG which define similar services for ISDN based networks.

== Standards ==
- H.450.1, Supplementary Services Framework

The general mechanism for delivering supplementary services is explained in this paper. Supplementary services messages are exchanged by means of ROSE (Remote Operations Service Extension).

- H.450.2, Call Transfer Supplementary Service

E.g. explains how a party-B can turn an active call between party-A and party-B into a call between party-A and a new party-C.

- H.450.3, Call Diversion Supplementary Service

E.g. explains how an IP phone can activate a diversion to e.g. a cell phone. E.g. explains how an IP phone can interrogate whether it has any active diversion.

- H.450.4, Call Hold Supplementary Service

E.g. explains how a call can be put on hold and be fed with a music on hold.

- H.450.5, Call Park and Pickup Supplementary Service

Think of big warehouse, where a call is coming in at the front-desk for Mrs. Smith. The front-desk parks the call and broadcasts via the intercom: "Mrs. Smith, please 223". Mrs. Smith proceeds soon after to the next wall phone, dials 223 and gets the call.

- H.450.6, Call Waiting Supplementary Service

Explains how to signal a second call to an IP phone already engaged in an active call.

- H.450.7, Message Waiting Indication Supplementary Service

Explains elements related to voicebox systems and how these can be implemented by means of H.323.

- H.450.8, Name Identification Supplementary Service

Explains how names are displayed or how to intentionally call incognito.

- H.450.9, Call Completion Supplementary Service

Explains how to schedule an automatic call-back request in case of a remote party being busy in a call or being absent for a while and becoming available later on.

- H.450.10, Call Offer Supplementary Service

A variation of Call Waiting. Also known as "Camp-On".

- H.450.11, Call Intrusion Supplementary Service

Explains how e.g. the secretary of a CEO can intentionally and legally intrude into a call of her boss, in order to communicate urgent information.

- H.450.12, Common Information Additional Network Feature for H.323

A means to communicate additional miscellaneous information between endpoints. E.g. whether certain features are available, and/or allowed.
