= Information element =

An information element, sometimes informally referred to as a field, is an item in Q.931 and Q.2931 messages, IEEE 802.11 management frames, and cellular network messages sent between a base transceiver station and a mobile phone or similar piece of user equipment. An information element is often a type–length–value item, containing 1) a type (which corresponds to the label of a field), a length indicator, and a value, although any combination of one or more of those parts is possible. A single message may contain multiple information elements.

The abbreviation IE is found in many technical specification documents from 3GPP. It is not uncommon for a single specification document to contain thousands of references to IEs.

== See also ==
- Mobile telephony
