= B channel =

Telecommunications term associated with ISDN

B channel (bearer) is a telecommunications term which refers to the ISDN channel in which the primary data or voice communication is carried. It has a bit rate of 64 kbit/s in full duplex.

The term is applied primarily in relation to the ISDN access interfaces (PRA or PRI and BRA or BRI), since deeper in the PSTN network an ISDN bearer channel is essentially indistinguishable from any other bearer channel.

Apart from any transmission errors, the purpose of the network is to carry the contents of the B channel transparently between the endpoints of the call. Exceptions to this general principle include:

- If one or more trunks on the route between the endpoints employ robbed-bit signaling, this will result in frequent bit errors in the least-significant bit of bytes transported by the channel, effectively limiting the channel to 56 kbit/s.
- If the call has been established as a long-distance voice call, then echo cancellers may be being employed. While these improve the quality of the channel when it is used for voice communications, they render the channel essentially useless for data communications purposes (whether modulated or not).
- International voice calls may include A-law to μ-law conversion, which also impairs the channel when used for data communications purposes.
- Long-distance voice calls may also employ some form of voice compression, typically provided by equipment such as DCME.

In order to assure the usability of the channel for data communications, the following measures are at the disposal of users:

- ISDN terminal equipment can specify the required Bearer Capability when establishing the call.
- If the call is being set up as a voice call between modems, then a 2100 Hz answer tone sent in the backward direction during the initial seconds of the conversation phase of the call will result in any echo cancellers or echo suppressors being disabled for the remainder of the call.

== See also ==
- D channel
- H channel
