= Stoosbahn =

Funicular railway in the Canton of Schwyz, Switzerland

Coordinates: 46°59′7.5″N 8°40′15.2″E

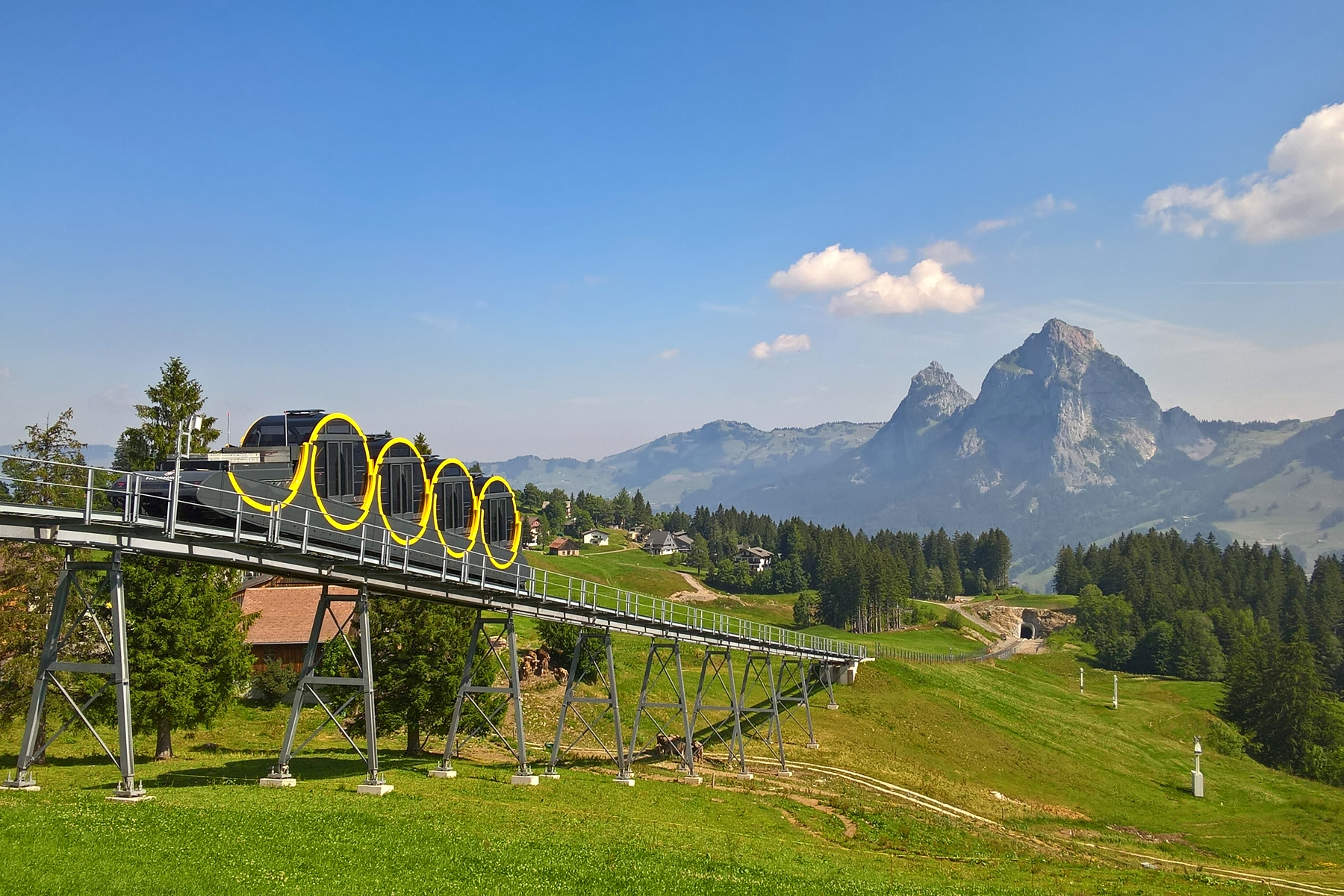

Overview
- Other name: Stoos Funicular
- Native name: Standseilbahn Schwyz - Stoos
- Status: in operation
- Owner: Stoosbahnen AG
- Locale: Stoos
- Termini: Schwyz Hinteres Schlattli; Stoos
- Stations: 2
- Website: stoos-muotatal.ch/train/stoosbahnen/

Service
- Type: Commuter funicular
- Services: 1
- Operator: Stoosbahnen AG
- Rolling stock: 2 for 136 passengers each

History
- Work began: 2012
- Opened: 15 December 2017 (8 years ago)
- Completed: 2017

Technical
- Line length: 1,740 metres (5,710 ft)
- Number of tracks: 1
- Character: Commuter and touristic funicular
- Track gauge: 1,435 mm (4 ft 8 1/2 in) standard gauge
- Old gauge: 1,200 mm (3 ft 11 1/4 in) the original line
- Electrification: from opening
- Operating speed: 10 metres per second (33 ft/s)
- Highest elevation: 1,306 metres (4,285 ft)
- Maximum incline: 110% (47.73°)

The Stoosbahn, also known as the Schwyz–Stoos funicular or Standseilbahn Schwyz–Stoos, is a funicular railway in the Swiss canton of Schwyz. It connects the Hintere Schlattli in the municipalities of Muotatal, Morschach, and Schwyz with the village and mountain resort of Stoos, above Morschach. On a length of 1.7 kilometres (1.1 mi), it overcomes a height difference of 744 metres (2,441 ft). It opened on 15 December 2017 and replaces the older Schwyz-Stoos funicular, operating since 1933 on a different route. The carriages are barrel-shaped and rotate to maintain a level floor surface for passengers. Construction took five years and cost 52 million Swiss francs.

The new line has a maximum gradient of 110% (47.7°-angle slope) and is the steepest funicular railway in Switzerland and Europe, superseding the Gelmerbahn. The Stoosbahn railway operator has claimed it to be the steepest funicular in the world and marketed it as such. This fact has been recognized by the Guinness Book of Records; however, it is not the steepest railway gradient, as Katoomba Scenic Railway in Australia as the steepest, at a maximum gradient of 128% (52°-angle slope). The Schilthorn cable car holding the overall record of the steepest cable car since 2024.

== Description ==
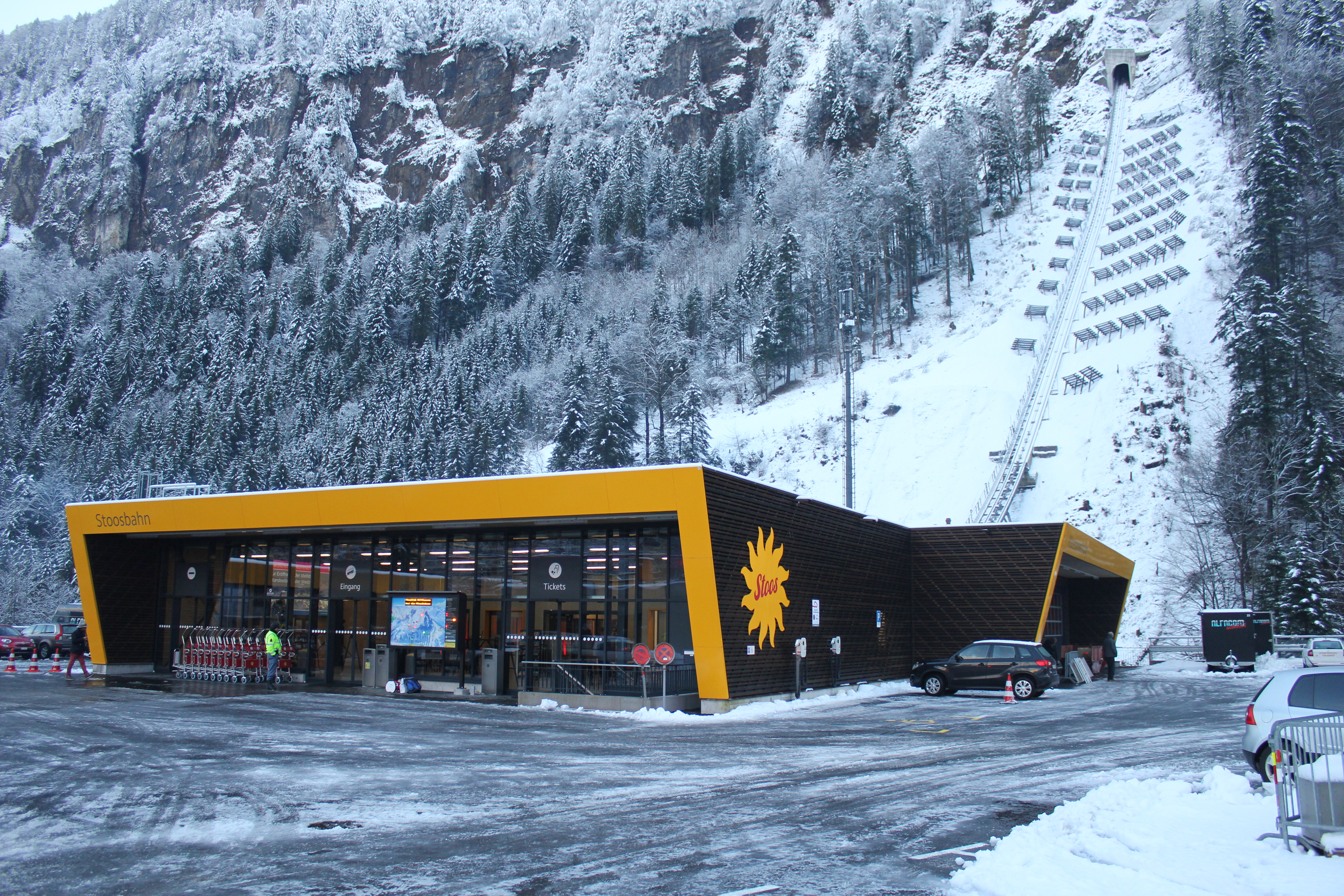
Valley station at the opening (December 2017)

Located in the far southeastern part of the municipal area of Schwyz, the capital of the canton, approximately 300 metres east of the valley station of the former cable railway and directly on the border with the municipality of Muotathal, the valley station of the Stoos funicular sits at an elevation of 562 m (1,844 ft) above sea level in the Hinteres Schlattli area. The 1,547-metre-long, perfectly straight track crosses the Muota river on a 90-metre-long bridge immediately after leaving the valley station. While the bridge has a gentle incline, the gradient increases sharply thereafter, reaching a maximum of 1,100 per mille (‰, equivalent to 47.73°) at the southern portal of the Zingelfluh tunnel (245 m). This steep gradient is maintained until the middle of the subsequent Ober Zingeli tunnel (80 m). At 685 metres along the track, a passing loop is located at an elevation of 1,091 m (3,579 ft). In the Stoosfluh tunnel (223 m), which passes beneath the former public swimming pool at the northern edge of the Stoos plateau, the gradient significantly decreases. The incline then ranges between 90 and 190 per mille, and the track levels out just before reaching the upper station. The upper station, at 1,306 m (4,285 ft), is situated next to the Klingenstock Hotel, providing more direct access to the adjacent ski resort than the previous cable railway. Due to the horizontal tracks at both terminal stations, the system required an additional counter-rope.

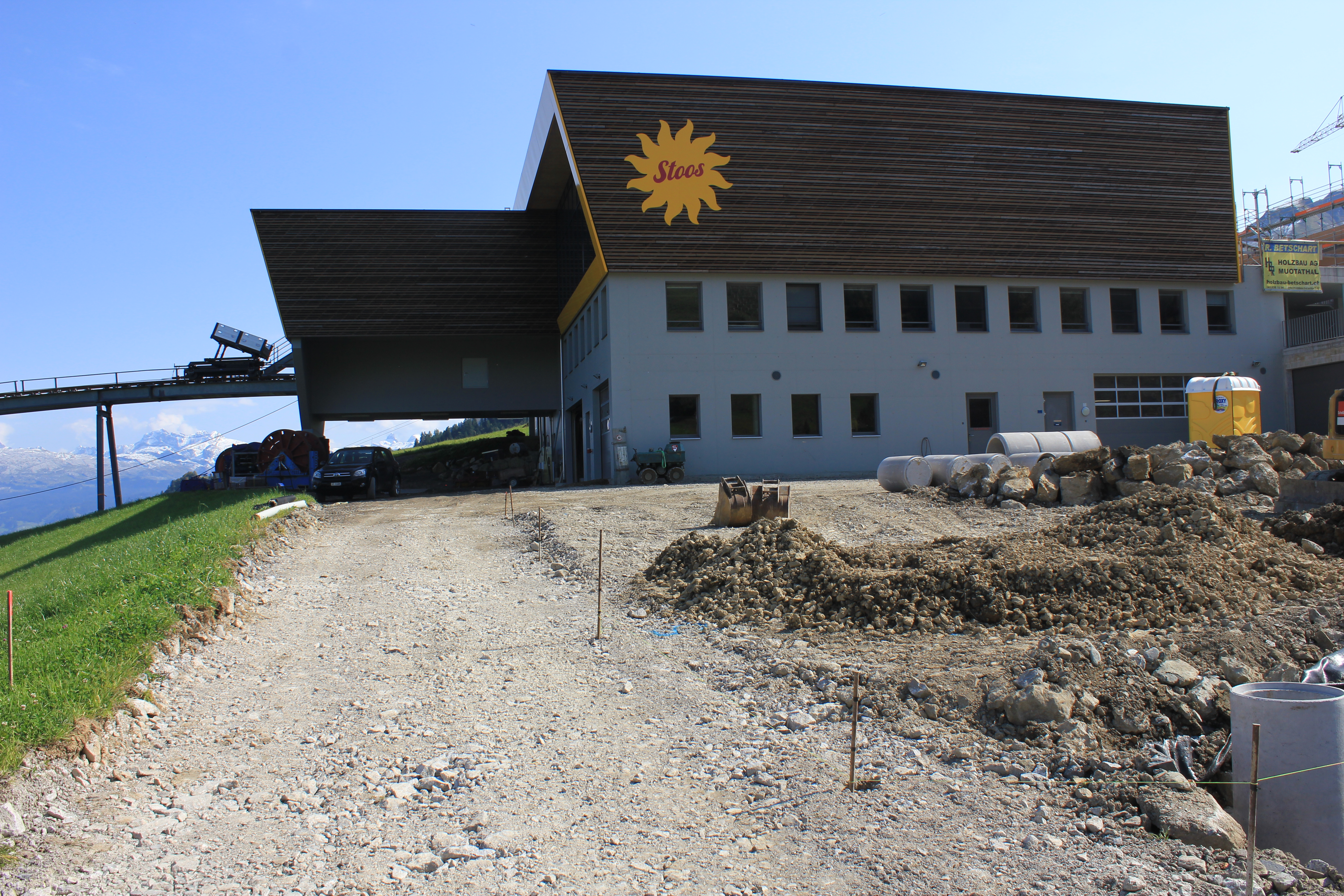
Upper station under construction (September 2017)

The funicular has the following technical specifications:

- Length: 1,740 m (5,710 ft)
- Height difference: 744 m (2,441 ft)
- Track gauge: 1,435 mm (4 ft 8 1/2 in)
- Maximum gradient: 1,100‰ (47.73°)
- Passing loop: Abt switch
- Vehicles: 2 (each carrying 136 passengers)
- Drive system: Located at the upper station, power: 1,000 kW (1,300 hp)
- Cable diameter: 54 mm (2.1 in)
- Speed: 10 m/s (36 km/h; 22 mph)
- Journey time: 4 minutes
- Capacity: 1,500 passengers per hour

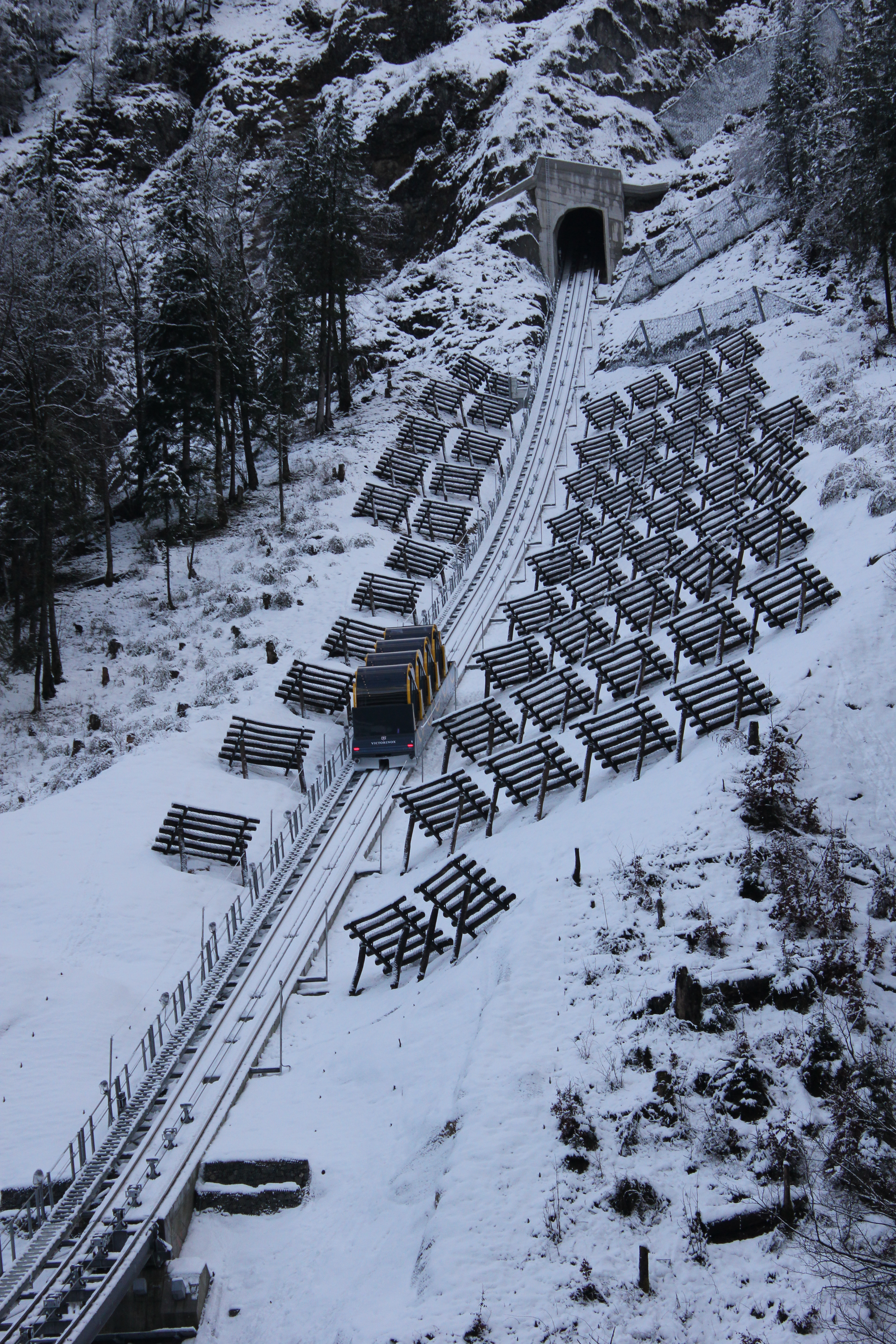
Vehicle on the lower steep section

With a maximum gradient of 1,100‰, the Stoos funicular is considered to the steepest funicular railway in the world. Although the Katoomba Scenic Railway in Australia has a steeper gradient of 1,280‰, it is classified as an inclined lift, consisting of four coupled cars pulled by a cable on a winch, without a passing loop.

An Auto AG Schwyz bus service connects the valley station with the town of Schwyz and the Schwyz railway station.

== Vehicles ==
Conventional funiculars often feature vehicles with stepped compartments to compensate for the incline, with station platforms designed as stairs, as seen in the former Stoos cable railway. In contrast, the two vehicles of the new funicular, built by Garaventa in Goldau, remain completely horizontal at the stations. Despite the extreme steepness of the track, boarding and alighting are level, even for passengers with prams or wheelchairs, across all compartments. The four passenger cabins consist of cylindrical elements with large windows, each accommodating 34 passengers. Each compartment is hydraulically rotated to match the track's gradient, ensuring the passenger platform remains horizontal at all times. Goods are transported on a platform mounted on the uphill side of the vehicle, with passenger and freight transport logistically separated to enhance comfort. Due to the gradient reduction to horizontal at the stations, hold-down rollers for the haulage cable are installed on the exit bridge and before the first tunnel to prevent the cable from lifting excessively when pulling the lower vehicle.

== History ==
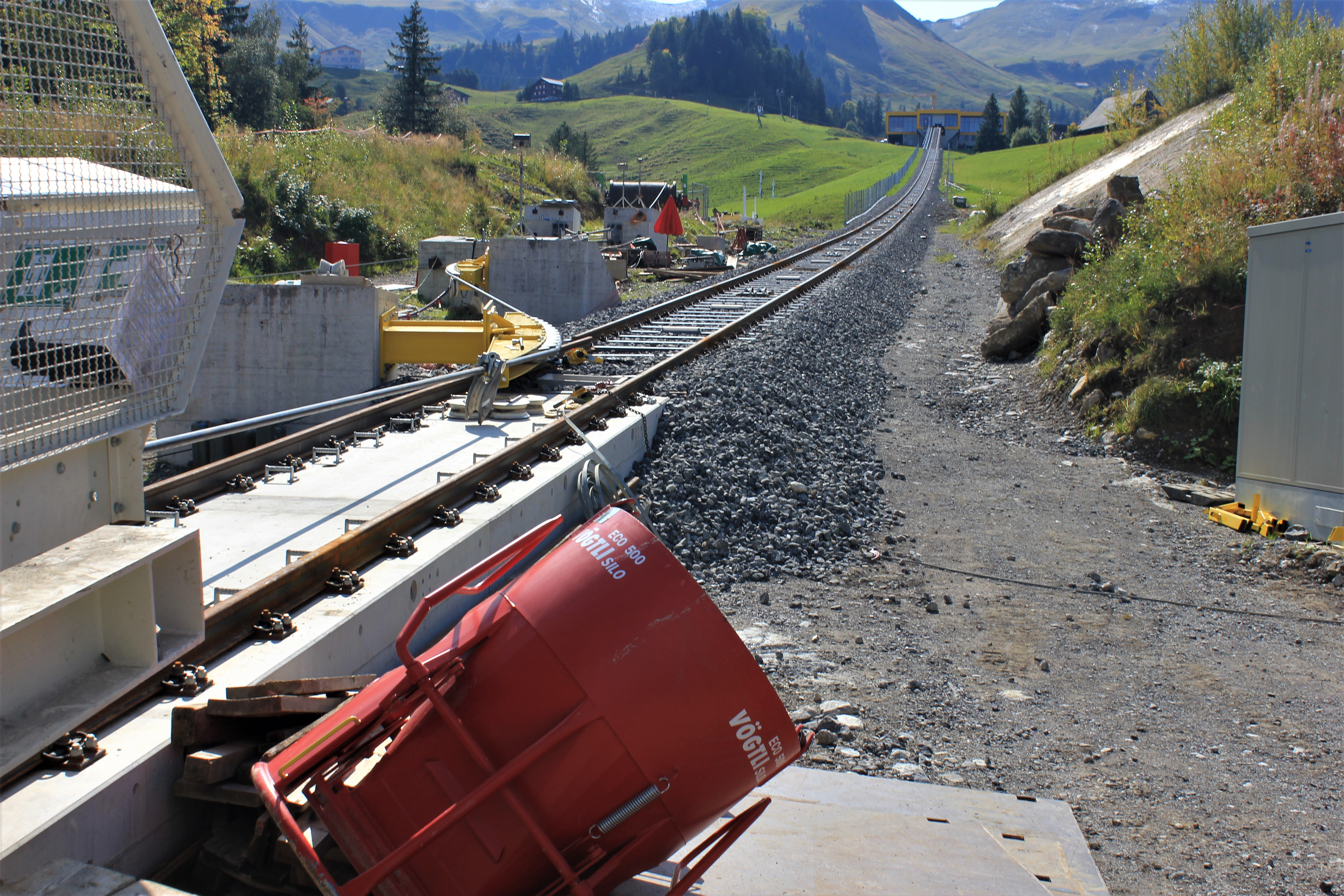
Track construction (September 2017)

From 1933 to 2017, access to Stoos was provided by the Schwyz–Stoos funicular. Its concession was granted for 80 years, and the railway was considered technically outdated. In February 2004, the municipality of Morschach and the Rigi-Schwyz regional association commissioned a feasibility study to evaluate options for future access. The existing railway would have required extensive renovations to meet modern safety standards, but these would not have yielded significant improvements. Consequently, in April 2008, the board of directors of Sportbahnen Schwyz-Stoos-Fronalpstock AG (SSSF) decided to pursue a 3S cableway project from Hinteres Schlattli to Stoos. On 30 November 2008, a municipal referendum in Morschach approved a planning loan for the project.

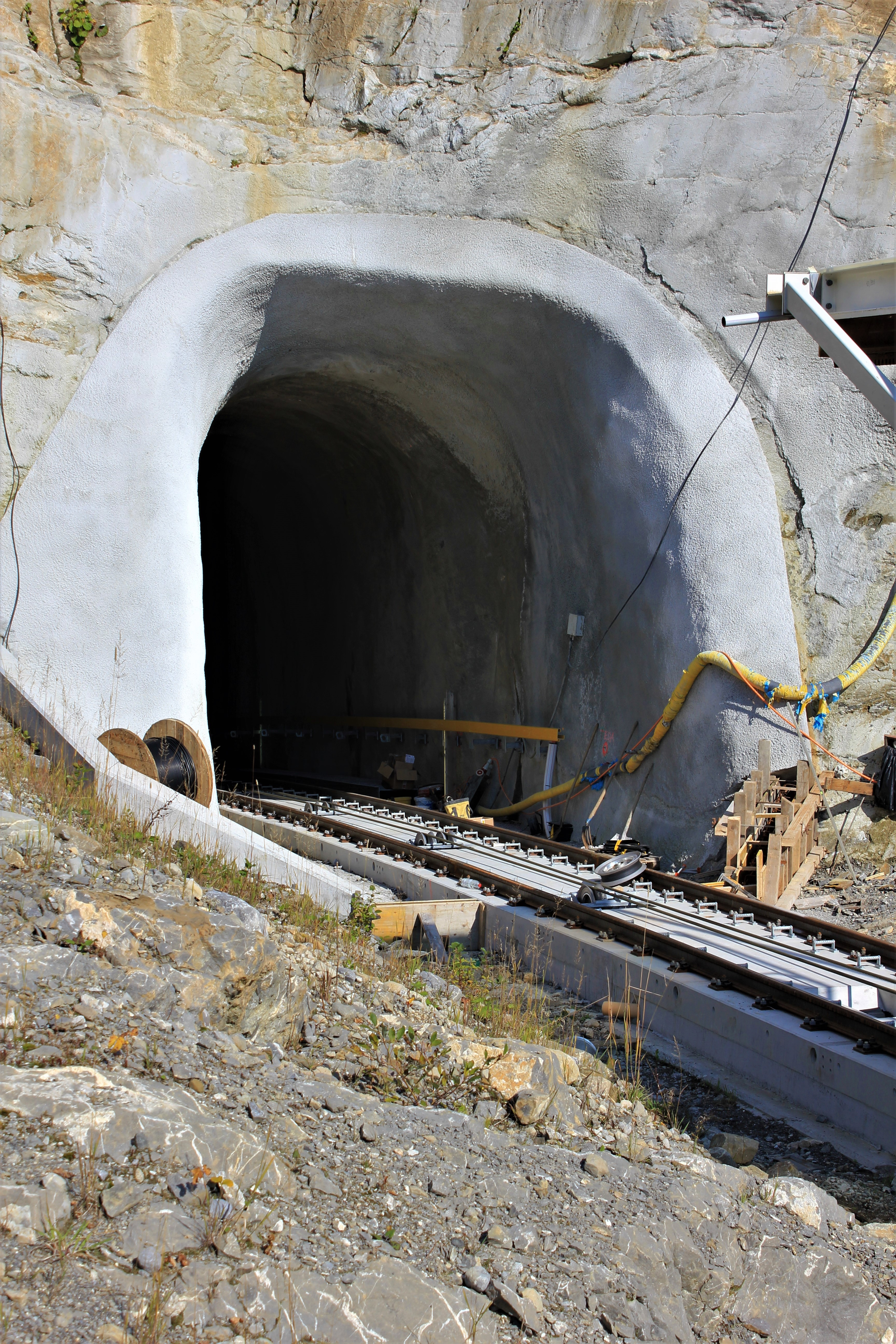
Stoosfluh tunnel under construction (September 2017)

The 3S cableway project was abandoned a year later when it became clear that protecting it from stray bullets from the nearby Selgis shooting range would require disproportionate effort. In November 2009, planning began for a new funicular on the route originally intended for the 3S cableway, with initial public presentations in May 2010. The SSSF estimated costs at 39.5 million CHF, anticipating operations to commence in the winter season of December 2013. In June 2011, the SSSF announced that Garaventa had won an international tender for the electromechanical systems, including vehicles, electronics, control systems, rails, sleepers, ballast, and engineering.

Municipal referendums on 25 September 2011 in Schwyz, Morschach, and Muotathal approved necessary zoning changes with strong support. On 11 March 2012, voters in the Schwyz District approved a 5-million-CHF investment contribution, with 77.9% in favour. Additional funding included 5 million CHF from Morschach, 10 million CHF from federal and cantonal sources, and 1.9 million CHF from the federal regional policy fund, with the SSSF covering the remainder. By then, total costs had risen to 50 million CHF. Initial land clearing began in September 2012.

In September 2012, a consortium led by Implenia won a WTO-compliant tender for bridge and tunnel construction, embankments, and terrain cuts. A losing consortium appealed to the Schwyz Administrative Court, which granted a suspensive effect in November 2012. In January 2013, the court dismissed the appeal, upholding the tender process. On 1 May 2013, the new railway was transferred to Standseilbahn Schwyz-Stoos AG (StSS), a wholly owned subsidiary of the restructured and renamed Stoosbahnen AG. Construction began in July 2013, delayed by over six months, targeting an opening for the 2015/16 winter season.

On 29 November 2013, a material cableway used to transport construction materials and machinery collapsed, causing further delays of several months. Tunnelling began in May 2014 but faced challenges, including frequent drill head replacements and instances where drills became stuck in rock, pushing the opening back by two years and increasing costs to 52 million CHF. The final tunnel breakthrough occurred on 15 February 2017. In April 2017, track construction began using a custom-designed machine that laid prefabricated 5.6-metre concrete track segments, including rails, cable rollers, and a service walkway, while moving uphill.

The funicular was inaugurated over the weekend of 15–17 December 2017. Swiss Federal President Doris Leuthard was among the first passengers on 15 December. On 16 December, residents of the Stoos-Muotatal region and Schwyz municipality used the railway for free. The official handover to public operation took place on 17 December at 12:17.
