= Dynamic synchronous transfer mode =

Dynamic synchronous transfer mode (DTM) is an optical networking technology standardized by the European Telecommunications Standards Institute (ETSI) in 2001 beginning with specification ETSI ES 201 803-1. DTM is a time-division multiplexing and a circuit-switching network technology that combines switching and transport. It is designed to provide a guaranteed quality of service (QoS) for streaming video services, but can be used for packet-based services as well. It is marketed for professional media networks, mobile TV networks, digital terrestrial television (DTT) networks, in content delivery networks and in consumer oriented networks, such as "triple play" networks.

== History ==
The DTM architecture was conceived in 1985 and developed at the Royal Institute of Technology (KTH) in Sweden. It was published in February 1996.

The research team was split into two spin-off companies, reflecting two different approaches to use the technology. One of these companies remains active in the field and delivers commercial products based on the DTM technology. Its name is Net Insight.

== See also ==
- Broadband Integrated Services Digital Network
