= Service data adaptation protocol =

Service Data Adaptation Protocol is a protocol specified by 3GPP. The SDAP sublayer is configured by RRC. SDAP maps the QoS flow to the Bearer service.
