= H channel =

High-speed communication channel

In the Integrated Services Digital Network (ISDN), a high-speed communication channel comprising multiple aggregated low-speed channels to accommodate bandwidth-intensive applications such as file transfer, videoconferencing, and high-quality audio. An H channel is formed of multiple bearer B channels bonded together in a primary rate access (PRA) or primary rate interface (PRI) frame in support of applications with bandwidth requirements that exceed the B channel rate of 64 kbit/s. The channels, once bonded, remain so end-to-end, from transmitter to receiver, through the ISDN network. The feature is known variously as multirate ISDN, Nx64, channel aggregation, and bonding.

H channels are implemented as:

- H0 = 384 kbit/s(6 B channels)
- H10 = 1472 kbit/s(23 B channels)
- H11 = 1536 kbit/s(24 B channels)
- H12 = 1920 kbit/s(30 B channels) – International (E-carrier) only.

== See also ==
- D channel
- B channel
