= Answer tone =

Feature of wireline modems

Answer tone is a feature of wireline modems.

ITU-T Answer Tone
Typical 2,100Hz answer tone with phase reversals and amplitude modulation.

The answer tone is the first signal sent by the answering modem after the billing delay. In its most basic form, it is a single continuous tone with a frequency of 2100 Hz (or 2225 Hz for Bell modes). It is the tone heard by the caller after dialing the number.

The plain 2100 Hz tone is meant to disable echo suppressors on international trunk connections. It may include 180° phase reversals at intervals of 450 ms to disable network echo cancellers. It may also be amplitude modulated by a 15 Hz signal to indicate ITU-T V.8 capability.
