= Bissulfosuccinimidyl suberate =

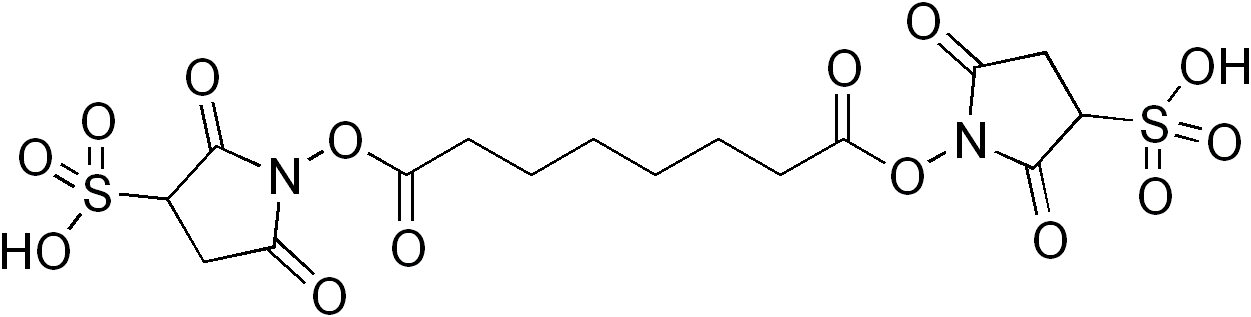

Names
- IUPAC name 1-[8-(2,5-Dioxo-3-sulfopyrrolidin-1-yl)oxy-8-oxooctanoyl]oxy-2,5-dioxopyrrolidine-3-sulfonic acid
- Other names Disulfosuccinimidyl suberate; Bis(sulfosuccinimidyl)suberate; BS3

Identifiers
CAS Number	82436-77-9
3D model (JSmol)	Interactive image
ChemSpider	110394
ECHA InfoCard	100.110.895
PubChem CID	123854
UNII	E647932J7Z
CompTox Dashboard (EPA)	DTXSID801002683
- InChI: InChI=1S/C16H20N2O14S2/c19-11-7-9(33(25,26)27)15(23)17(11)31-13(21)5-3-1-2-4-6-14(22)32-18-12(20)8-10(16(18)24)34(28,29)30/h9-10H,1-8H2,(H,25,26,27)(H,28,29,30) Key: VYLDEYYOISNGST-UHFFFAOYSA-N; InChI=1/C16H20N2O14S2/c19-11-7-9(33(25,26)27)15(23)17(11)31-13(21)5-3-1-2-4-6-14(22)32-18-12(20)8-10(16(18)24)34(28,29)30/h9-10H,1-8H2,(H,25,26,27)(H,28,29,30) Key: VYLDEYYOISNGST-UHFFFAOYAE
- SMILES: C1C(C(=O)N(C1=O)OC(=O)CCCCCCC(=O)ON2C(=O)CC(C2=O)S(=O)(=O)O)S(=O)(=O)O

Properties
Chemical formula	C_{16}H_{20}N_{2}O_{14}S_{2}
Molar mass	528.46 g·mol^{−1}
- Except where otherwise noted, data are given for materials in their standard state (at 25 °C [77 °F], 100 kPa). verify (what is ?) Infobox references

Bissulfosuccinimidyl suberate (BS3) is a crosslinker used in biological research. It is a water-soluble version of disuccinimidyl suberate.

== Crosslinkers ==
Crosslinkers are chemical reagents that play a crucial role in the preparation of conjugates used in biological research particularly immuno-technologies and protein studies. Crosslinkers are designed to covalently interact with molecules of interest, resulting in conjugation. A spacer arm, generally consisting of several atoms, separates the two molecules, and the nature and length of this spacer is important to consider when designing an assay involving the selected crosslinker. Bissulfosuccinimidyl suberate is an example of a homobifunctional crosslinker.

== Characteristics ==
BS3 has the following relevant characteristics:

- Polar: BS3 is hydrophilic due to its terminal sulfonyl substituents and as a result soluble in water, eliminating the need to use organic solvents which can interfere with protein structure and function. This makes it ideal for investigations into protein structure and function in physiologic conditions. Since BS3 is a charged molecule, it cannot freely pass through cellular membranes which makes it an ideal crosslinker for cell surface proteins.
- Stable linkage: The BS3 crosslinker has an aliphatic 8-atom spacer and is not cleaved under physiological conditions. BS3 forms covalent bonds to its conjugate molecules, meaning that once BS3 creates covalent linkages to its target molecules, those linkages are not easily broken.
- Homobifunctional: BS3 is a homobifunctional crosslinker in that it has two identical reactive groups, i.e. the N-hydroxysulfosuccinimide (Sulfo-NHS) esters, which can undergo addition/elimination reactions with nucleophiles.
- Amine-reactive: BS3 is amine-reactive in that its N-hydroxysulfosuccinimide (NHS) esters at each end react specifically with primary amines to form stable amide bonds in a nucleophilic acyl substitution-type reaction in which the N-hydroxysulfosuccinimide acts as the leaving group. BS3 is particularly useful in protein-related applications in that it can react with the primary amines on the side chain of lysine residues and the N-terminus of polypeptide chains. This crosslinker can also be used to stabilize protein-protein interactions for further analysis by immunoprecipitation or crosslinking mass spectrometry.

== Deuterated BS3 ==
The deuterated crosslinker bis(sulfosuccinimidyl) 2,2,7,7-suberate-d4 is the "heavy" BS3 crosslinking agent that contains four deuterium atoms. When used in mass spectrometry studies, BS3-d4 provides a 4 Da shift compared to crosslinked proteins with the non-deuterated analog (BS3-d_{0}). Thus, "heavy" and "light" crosslinker analogs can be used for isotopically labeling protein and peptides in mass spectrometry research applications.

== Applications ==
- Cell-surface receptor-ligand studies
- Crosslinking biomolecules on cells
- Fixation of protein complexes prior to protein interaction analysis
- Cross-linking of antibodies for immunoprecipitation studies

== Disuccinimidyl suberate ==
Disuccinimidyl suberate (DSS) is the non-water-soluble analog of BS3. DSS and BS3 express the same crosslinking ability toward primary amines. The structural difference between these two molecules is that DSS does not contain the sulfonate substituents at either end of the molecule, leading to the uncharged, non-polar nature of the DSS molecule. Due to the hydrophobic nature of this crosslinker, it must be dissolved in an organic solvent such as dimethylsulfoxide, before it can be added to an aqueous sample. Because of the ability of DSS to cross cell membranes, it is best suited for applications where intracellular crosslinking is needed.

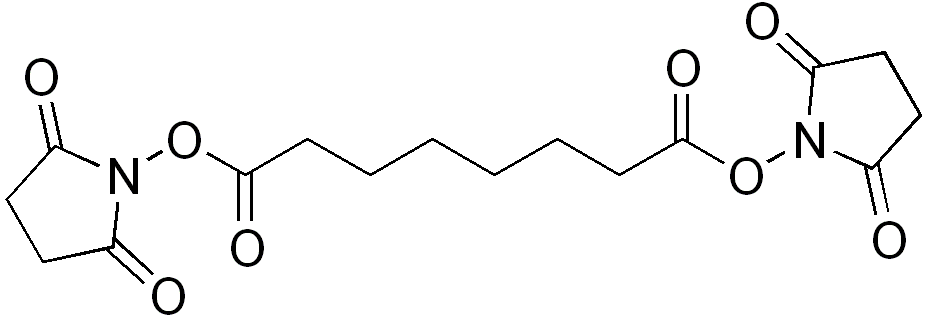
Chemical structure of disuccinimidyl suberate
