= Demographic surveillance system =

Public health population monitoring system

In the fields of demographics and public health, a demographic surveillance system (DSS), also called a health and demographic surveillance system (HDSS), gathers longitudinal health and demographic data for a dynamic cohort of the total population in a specified geographic area. An HDSS is created by first executing a census of households in the area as a baseline, followed by regular visits to each household to gather health and demographic data. The cohort is dynamic in that members are added through birth or immigration and members are subtracted through death or emigration. Tracking population migration is particularly important for understanding of HDSS data.

In developing countries, there is commonly a lack of health and demographic information at the community or population level. For instance, cause of death may be unknown for deaths occurring outside of health facilities. One approach to collecting such data is the cross-sectional Demographic and Health Surveys (DHS). HDSS provide a complement to episodic DHS by collecting longitudinally data over time, often with multiple household surveys.

HDSS sites originated in the 1960s. Since then, many HDSS in developing countries have organized together in the INDEPTH network. As of 2017, INDEPTH has 47 HDSS sites following roughly 3 million people. One function of INDEPTH is to gather data across HDSS and to establish standards for data acquisition. There are other demographic and health data gathering programs similar to DSS that are not part of INDEPTH, such as the Sample Registration system in India and the Disease Surveillance Points system in China.

== Seel also ==
- Bandim Health Project
