= D channel =

D channel (delta channel) is a telecommunications term which refers to the ISDN channel in which the control and signalling information is carried.

The bit rate of the D channel of a basic rate interface is 16 kbit/s, whereas it amounts to 64 kbit/s on a primary rate interface.

For DSS1 signalling, the D channel layer 2 protocol is Q.921 also called LAPD and it carries Layer 3 messages according to Q.931 protocol.

== See also ==
- B channel
- H channel
