= Stoos =

Swiss village

Coordinates: 46°58′57″N 08°39′54″E

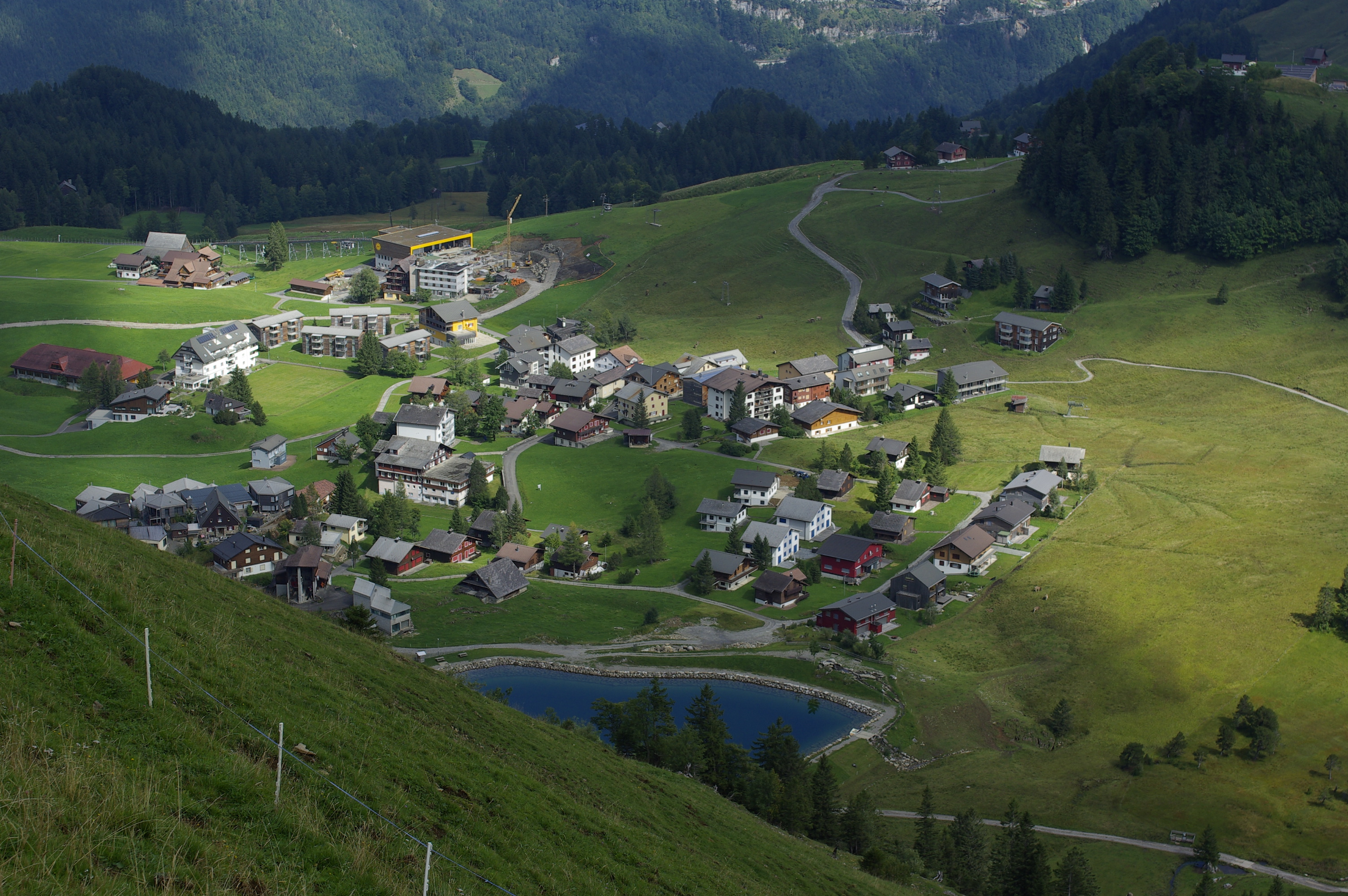
Stoos

Stoos is a village located in the municipality of Morschach. It is situated at 1,300 m (4,300 ft) in the Swiss canton of Schwyz and has about 100 inhabitants (population was counted at 106 during a 2007 census).

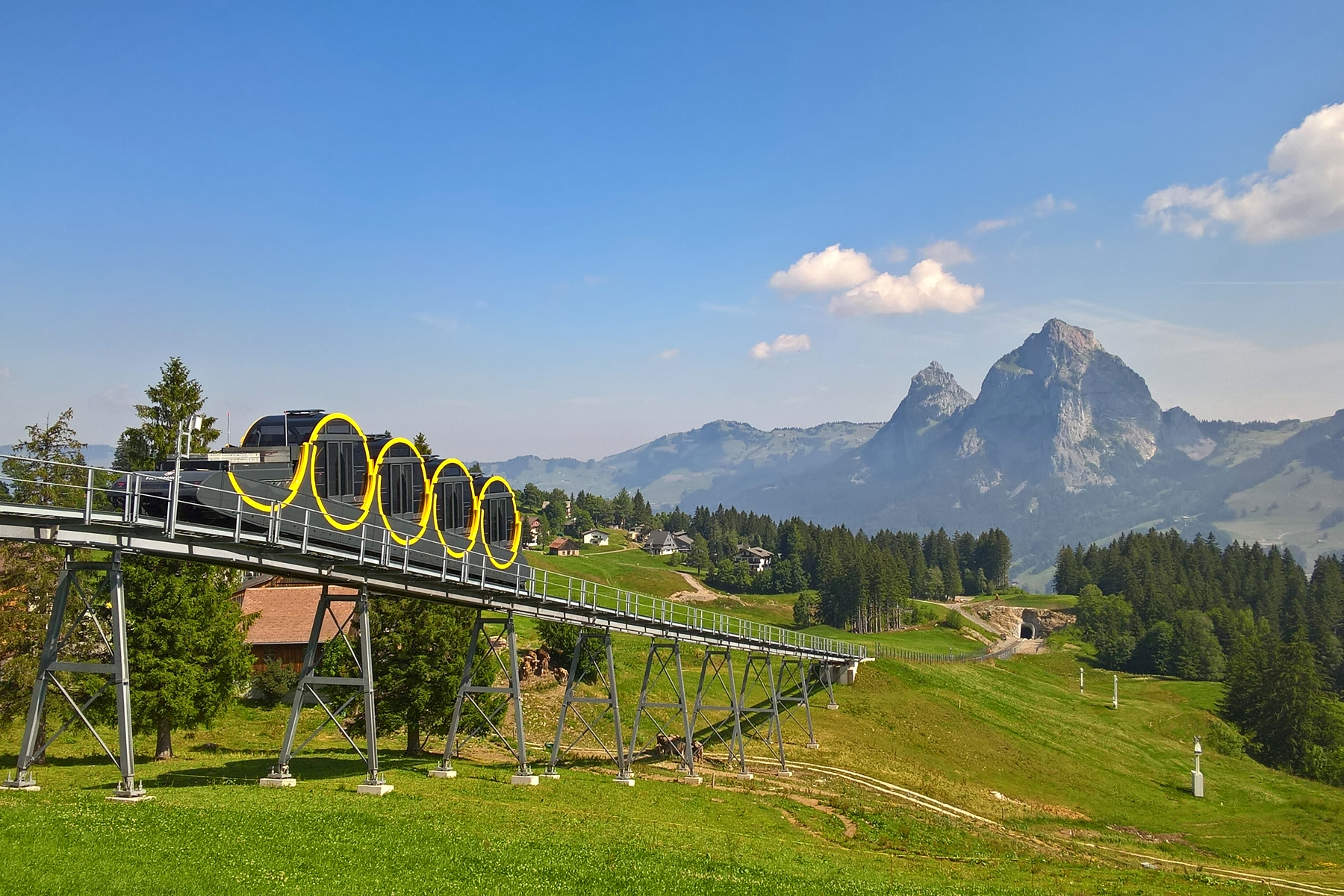
The Stoosbahn

It is used as a small ski resort with a cable car leading to the Fronalpstock.

The village is accessible via the Stoosbahn funicular railway and Morschach–Stoos cable car. A small road, unsuitable for regular traffic, is open to permit holders only.

The Swiss Olympic skier Hedi Beeler was born here.
