= Echo suppression and cancellation =

Preventing or removing echo in telephony

Echo suppression and echo cancellation are methods used in telephony to improve voice quality by preventing echo from being created or removing it after it is already present. In addition to improving subjective audio quality, echo suppression increases the capacity achieved through silence suppression by preventing echo from traveling across a telecommunications network. Echo suppressors were developed in the 1950s in response to the first use of satellites for telecommunications.

Echo suppression and cancellation methods are commonly called acoustic echo suppression (AES) and acoustic echo cancellation (AEC), and more rarely line echo cancellation (LEC). In some cases, these terms are more precise, as there are various types and causes of echo with unique characteristics, including acoustic echo (sounds from a loudspeaker being reflected and recorded by a microphone, which can vary substantially over time) and line echo (electrical impulses caused by, e.g., coupling between the sending and receiving wires, impedance mismatches, electrical reflections, etc., which varies much less than acoustic echo). In practice, however, the same techniques are used to treat all types of echo, so an acoustic echo canceller can cancel line echo as well as acoustic echo. AEC in particular is commonly used to refer to echo cancellers in general, regardless of whether they were intended for acoustic echo, line echo, or both.

Although echo suppressors and echo cancellers have similar goals—preventing a speaking individual from hearing an echo of their own voice—the methods they use are different:

- Echo suppressors work by detecting a voice signal going in one direction on a circuit, and then muting or attenuating the signal in the other direction. Usually, the echo suppressor at the far end of the circuit does this muting when it detects voice coming from the near end of the circuit. This muting prevents the speaker from hearing their own voice returning from the far end.
- Echo cancellation involves first recognizing the originally transmitted signal that reappears, with some delay, in the transmitted or received signal. Once the echo is recognized, it can be removed by subtracting it from the transmitted or received signal. This technique is generally implemented digitally using a digital signal processor or software, although it can be implemented in analog circuits as well.

ITU standards G.168 and P.340 describe requirements and tests for echo cancellers in digital and PSTN applications, respectively.

== History ==
In telephony, echo is the reflected copy of one's voice heard some time later. If the delay is fairly significant (more than a few hundred milliseconds), it is considered annoying. If the delay is very small (tens of milliseconds or less), the phenomenon is called sidetone. If the delay is slightly longer, around 50 milliseconds, humans cannot hear the echo as a distinct sound, but instead hear a chorus effect.

In the earlier days of telecommunications, echo suppression was used to reduce the objectionable nature of echoes to human users. One person speaks while the other listens, and they speak back and forth. An echo suppressor attempts to determine which is the primary direction and allows that channel to go forward. In the reverse channel, it places attenuation to block or suppress any signal on the assumption that the signal is echo. Although the suppressor effectively deals with echo, this approach leads to several problems, which may be frustrating for both parties to a call.

- Double-talk: It is fairly normal in conversation for both parties to speak at the same time, at least briefly. Because each echo suppressor will then detect voice energy coming from the far end of the circuit, the effect would ordinarily be for loss to be inserted in both directions at once, effectively blocking both parties. To prevent this, echo suppressors can be set to detect voice activity from the near-end speaker and to fail to insert loss (or insert a smaller loss) when both the near-end speaker and far-end speaker are talking. This, of course, temporarily defeats the primary effect of having an echo suppressor at all.
- Clipping: Since the echo suppressor is alternately inserting and removing loss, there is frequently a small delay when a new speaker begins talking that results in clipping the first syllable from that speaker's speech.
- Dead-set: If the far-end party on a call is in a noisy environment, the near-end speaker will hear that background noise while the far-end speaker is talking, but the echo suppressor will suppress this background noise when the near-end speaker starts talking. The sudden absence of background noise gives the near-end user the impression that the line has gone dead.

In response to this, Bell Labs developed echo canceler theory in the early 1960s, which then resulted in laboratory echo cancelers in the late 1960s and commercial echo cancelers in the 1980s. An echo canceller works by generating an estimate of the echo from the talker's signal, and subtracts that estimate from the return path. This technique requires an adaptive filter to generate a signal accurate enough to effectively cancel the echo, where the echo can differ from the original due to various kinds of degradation along the way. Since their invention at AT&T Bell Labs, echo cancellation algorithms have been improved and honed. Like all echo-cancelling processes, these first algorithms were designed to anticipate the signal that would inevitably re-enter the transmission path, and cancel it.

Rapid advances in digital signal processing allowed echo cancellers to be made smaller and more cost-effective. In the 1990s, echo cancellers were implemented within voice switches for the first time (in the Northern Telecom DMS-250) rather than as standalone devices. The integration of echo cancellation directly into the switch meant that echo cancellers could be reliably turned on or off on a call-by-call basis, removing the need for separate trunk groups for voice and data calls. Today's telephony technology often employs echo cancellers in small or handheld communications devices via a software voice engine, which provides cancellation of either acoustic echo or the residual echo introduced by a far-end PSTN gateway system; such systems typically cancel echo reflections with up to 64 milliseconds delay.

== Operation ==
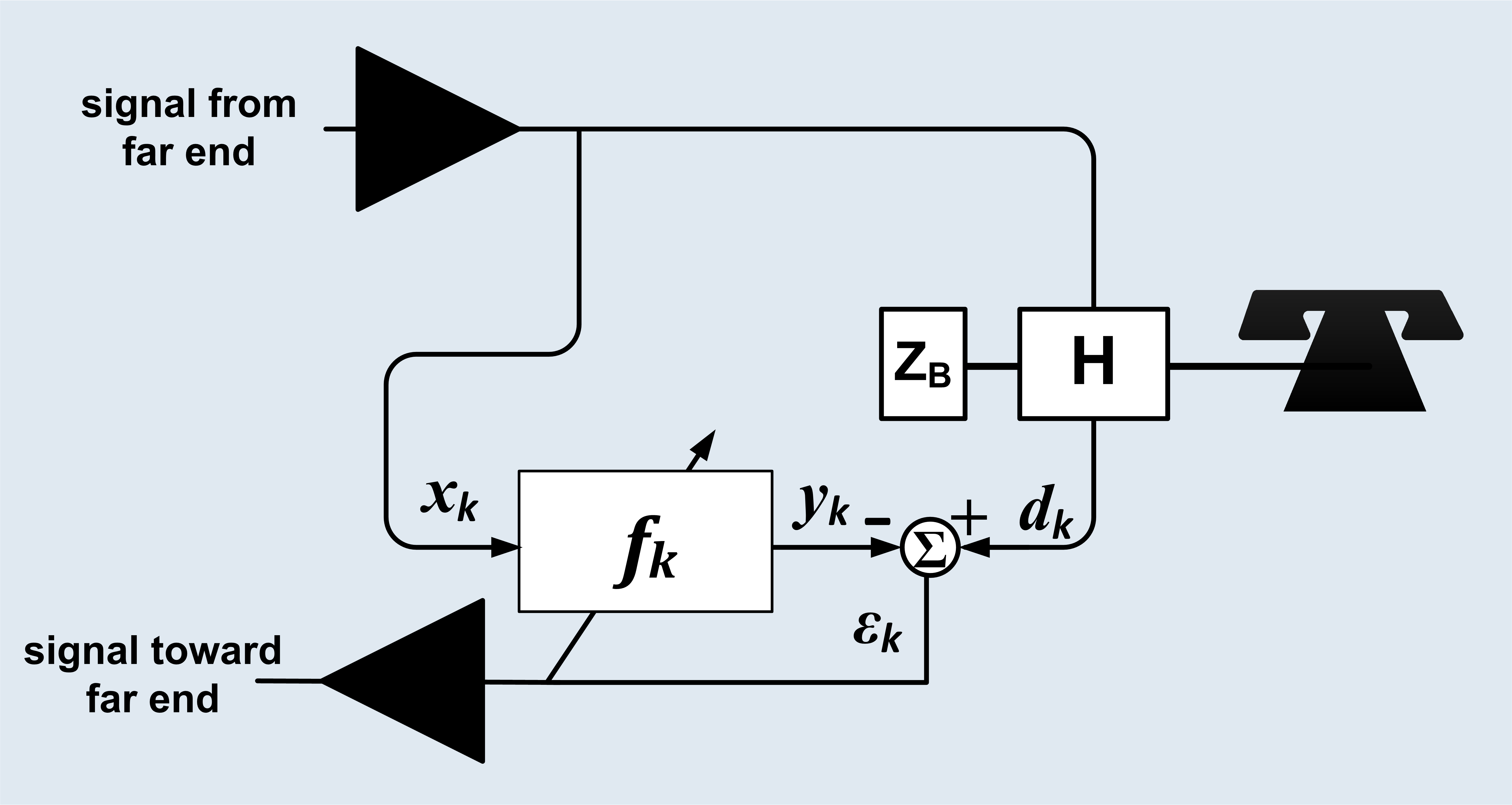
An adaptive echo canceler for a telephone circuit. The function of H, the hybrid transformer, is to route incoming speech from the far end x_{k} to the local telephone and route speech from the telephone to the far end. However, the hybrid is never perfect, so its output d_{k} contains both the desired speech from the local telephone plus filtered speech from the far end. The echo canceller is the adaptive filter f_{k}, which attempts to minimize the error signal ε_{k} by filtering the incoming far end speech into a replica y_{k} of the far end speech that leaks through the hybrid. Once the adaption is complete, the error signal consists mostly of speech from the local telephone.

The echo cancellation process works as follows:

1. A far-end signal is delivered to the system.
2. The far-end signal is reproduced.
3. The far-end signal is filtered and delayed to resemble the near-end signal.
4. The filtered far-end signal is subtracted from the near-end signal.
5. The resultant signal represents sounds present in the room, excluding any direct or reverberated sound.

The primary challenge for an echo canceller is determining the response characteristics of the filter to be applied to the far-end signal such that it resembles the resultant near-end echo. The filter is essentially a model of the speaker, microphone and the room's acoustical attributes. Echo cancellers must be adaptive because the characteristics of the near-end speaker and microphone are generally not known in advance. The acoustical attributes of the near-end's room are also not generally known in advance, and may change (e.g., if the microphone is moved relative to the speaker, or if individuals walk around the room causing changes in the acoustic reflections). By using the far-end signal as the stimulus, modern systems use an adaptive filter and can converge from providing no cancellation to 55 dB of cancellation in around 200 ms.

Echo cancellation alone may be insufficient in many applications. Echo cancellation and suppression can work in conjunction to achieve acceptable performance.

=== Quantifying echo ===
Echo is measured as echo return loss (ERL). This is the ratio, expressed in decibels, of the original signal and its echo. High values mean the echo is very weak, while low values mean the echo is very strong. Negative indicates the echo is stronger than the original signal, which, if left unchecked, would cause audio feedback.

The performance of an echo canceller is measured in echo return loss enhancement (ERLE), which is the amount of additional signal loss applied by the echo canceller. Most echo cancellers are able to apply 18 to 35 dB ERLE.

The total signal loss of the echo (ACOM) is the sum of the ERL and ERLE.

== Current uses ==
Sources of echo are found in everyday surroundings, such as:

- Hands-free car phone systems
- A standard telephone or cellphone in speakerphone mode
- Dedicated standalone speakerphones
- Installed conference room systems, which use ceiling speakers and microphones on the table
- Physical coupling where vibrations of the loudspeaker transfer to the microphone via the handset casing

In some of these cases, sound from the loudspeaker enters the microphone almost unaltered. The difficulties in canceling echo stem from the alteration of the original sound by the ambient space. These changes can include certain frequencies being absorbed by soft furnishings and the reflection of different frequencies at varying strengths.

Implementing AEC requires engineering expertise and a fast processor, usually in the form of a digital signal processor (DSP). This cost in processing capability may come at a premium; however, many embedded systems do have a fully functional AEC.

Smart speakers and interactive voice response systems that accept speech for input use AEC while speech prompts are played to prevent the system's own speech recognition from falsely recognizing the echoed prompts and other output.

=== Modems ===
Standard telephone lines use the same pair of wires to both send and receive audio, which results in a small amount of the outgoing signal being reflected back. This is useful for people talking on the phone, as it provides a signal to the speaker that their voice is making it through the system. However, this reflected signal causes problems for a modem, which is unable to distinguish between a signal from the remote modem and the echo of its own signal.

For this reason, earlier dial-up modems split the signal frequencies, so that the devices on either end used different tones, allowing each one to ignore any signals in the frequency range it was using for transmission. However, this diminished the amount of bandwidth available to both sides.

Echo cancellation mitigated this problem. During the call setup and negotiation period, both modems send a series of unique tones and then listen for them to return through the phone system. They measure the total delay time, then configure a delay line for that same period. Once the connection is completed, they send their signals into the phone lines as normal, but also into the delay line. When their signal is reflected back, it is mixed with the inverted signal from the delay line, which cancels out the echo. This allowed both modems to use the full spectrum available, doubling the possible speed.

Echo cancellation is also applied by many telcos to the line itself and can cause data corruption rather than improving the signal. Some telephone switches or converters (such as analog terminal adapters) disable echo suppression or echo cancellation when they detect the 2100 or 2225 Hz answer tones associated with such calls, in accordance with ITU-T recommendation G.164 or G.165.

ISDN and DSL modems operating at frequencies above the voice band over standard twisted-pair telephone wires also make use of automated echo cancellation to allow simultaneous bidirectional data communication. The computational complexity in implementing the adaptive filter is much reduced compared to voice echo cancellation because the transmit signal is a digital bit stream. Instead of a multiplication and an addition operation for every tap in the filter, only the addition is required. A RAM lookup table based echo cancelling scheme eliminates even the addition operation by simply addressing a memory with a truncated transmit bit stream to obtain the echo estimate. Echo cancellation is now commonly implemented with Digital Signal Processor (DSP) techniques.

Some modems use separate incoming and outgoing frequencies or allocate separate time slots for transmitting and receiving to eliminate the need for echo cancellation. Higher frequencies beyond the original design limits of telephone cables suffer significant attenuation distortion due to bridge taps and incomplete impedance matching. Deep, narrow frequency gaps, which cannot be remedied by echo cancellation, often result. These are detected and mapped out during connection negotiation.

== See also ==
- Audio feedback
- Least mean squares filter
- Mix-minus
- Signal reflection
- Voice engine
