= Disuccinimidyl suberate =

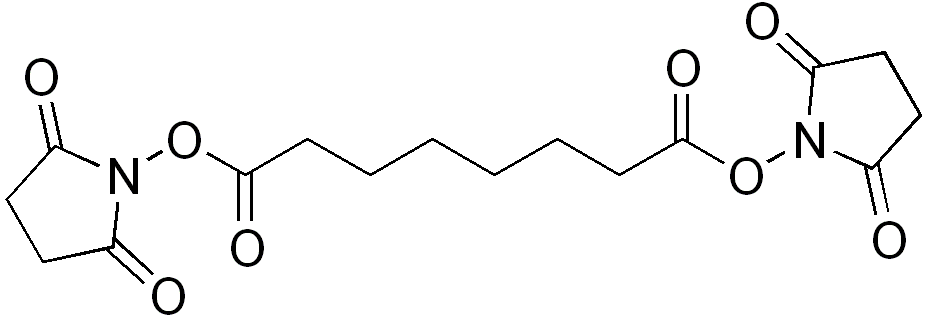

Names
- Preferred IUPAC name Bis(2,5-dioxopyrrolidin-1-yl) octanedioate
- Other names DSS; Suberic acid bis(N-hydroxysuccinimide ester)

Identifiers
CAS Number	76403-92-4
3D model (JSmol)	Interactive image
ChEBI	CHEBI:229718
ChemSpider	90944
ECHA InfoCard	100.130.330
EC Number	614-576-1
PubChem CID	100658
UNII	V9WYZ7QMDT
CompTox Dashboard (EPA)	DTXSID70988200
- InChI: InChI=1S/C16H20N2O8/c19-11-7-8-12(20)17(11)25-15(23)5-3-1-2-4-6-16(24)26-18-13(21)9-10-14(18)22/h1-10H2 Key: ZWIBGKZDAWNIFC-UHFFFAOYSA-N
- SMILES: C1CC(=O)N(C1=O)OC(=O)CCCCCCC(=O)ON2C(=O)CCC2=O

Properties
Chemical formula	C_{16}H_{20}N_{2}O_{8}
Molar mass	368.342 g·mol^{−1}
Appearance	Solid
- Except where otherwise noted, data are given for materials in their standard state (at 25 °C [77 °F], 100 kPa). verify (what is ?) Infobox references

Disuccinimidyl suberate (DSS) is a six-carbon lysine-reactive non-cleavable cross-linking agent.

It consists of functional groups It is a homobifunctional N-hydroxysuccinimide (NHS) ester formed by carbodiimide-activation of carboxylate molecules, with identical reactive groups at either end. The reactive groups are separated by a spacer and in this molecule it is a six carbon alkyl chain. This reagent is mainly used to form intramolecular crosslinks and preparation of polymers from monomers. It is ideal for receptor ligand cross-linking.

DSS is reactive towards amine groups (primary amines) at pH 7.0-9.0. It is membrane permeable, therefore permitting intracellular cross-linking, has high purity, is non-cleavable, and is water-insoluble (it must be dissolved in a polar organic solvent such as DMF or DMSO before addition to sample.)

Its reaction specificity, reaction product stability, and lack of reaction by-products make it a commonly used cross-linking agent.

== Applications ==
- Chemical crosslinking of intracellular proteins prior to cell lysis and immunoprecipitation
- 'Fix' protein interactions to allow identification of weak or transient protein interactions
- Protein crosslinking to create bioconjugates via single-step reactions
- Immobilize proteins onto amine-coated surfaces
- Crosslinking mass spectrometry (crosslinking-MS) provides insight into protein structure, organization, and interactions

== Size exclusion chromatography ==
A study was done looking at the application of size exclusion chromatography in the purification of cross-link peptides within samples. When the eluted peptides were analyzed, cross-linked peptides could be detected at higher concentrations in the earlier fractions, eluting before modified or unmodified peptides.

== Cross-linking with hemoglobin-albumin ==
Disuccinimidyl suberate's reactivity toward primary amines allows it to serve as a cross-linking agent for proteins, without toxic side-products and forming peptide bonds with the lysine residues in a single step. In a study on blood substitutes, DSS was shown to cross-link Hemoglobin intramolecularly, yielding a relatively stable protein (polymerized Hb or polyHb), whose oxygen affinity was almost halved compared to that of native Hb. This was shown to be reversed when Hemoglobin was copolymerized with bovine serum albumin (BSA), showing very little change in auto-oxidation and oxygen affinity compared to the native Hb.

== See also ==
- Bissulfosuccinimidyl suberate, a water-soluble version
