= Bearer channel =

A bearer channel is a DS-0 that carries call content i.e. one that does not carry signaling. In the common-channel signaling scheme for telecommunications, signaling is sent out-of-band, while all other traffic rides bearer channels. When a call is set up, the Bearer Capability is negotiated, and this is used to determine what type of traffic is sent across the bearer channel.

Bearer channels are the most prevalent types of DS-0s in the Digital Transmission Hierarchies.

The most well known example of a bearer channel is the ISDN B channel.

== See also ==
- Bearer service
