= Digital Subscriber System No. 1 =

Digital Subscriber Signalling System No. 1 (DSS1) is a digital signalling protocol (D channel protocol) used for the ISDN. It is defined by ITU-T I.411 (ETS 300 102). It supports Bearer Capability, Low Level Compatibility and High Level Compatibility, ANI, DNIS and redirected number signaling in both directions. A standard developed by ETSI for Europe is known as Euro-ISDN or E-DSS1 or simply EDSS1 (European DSS1).

DSS1/EDSS1 protocol, in contrast, for example, to the protocol QSIG, was designed for use as access to public ISDN and asymmetric in the sense that it suggests a link with the network side at one end (digital public telephone exchange) and the user (private branch exchange (PBX)) - at the other.

Since the market for ISDN equipment was open, ETSI provided guidance to suppliers of ISDN equipment by means of the minimum requirements for inter-connectivity to ISDN networks. These documents, called NET3 for BRI and NET5 for PRI lines, described a set of protocol tests terminals should comply to. Later, testing institutes, like KEMA in the Netherlands, implemented and performed the protocol tests and provided the appropriate certificates.

In 1989, 26 network operators from 20 European countries decided to develop EDSS1 as a pan-European standard to replace earlier national protocols (such as FTZ 1 TR 6 (Germany) or VN3 (France)). EDSS1 has been one of the keys to the success of the ISDN within European countries (as compared to, for example, the U.S.).

Non-European countries using DSS1 include Australia, Brazil, Iran, India, Israel, New Zealand, Pakistan, Peru, Singapore, South Africa, Sri Lanka, Taiwan, Palestine, Mexico, and the United Arab Emirates.

The DSS1 protocol knows four different codesets for information elements. Codeset 0 regards to Q.931, Codeset 5 to the ETSI standard, Codeset 6 for national applications and Codeset 7 for PBX applications. The most common Codeset is 0/Q.931.
