= Bearer service =

In telecommunications, Bearer Service or data service is a service that allows transmission of information signals between network interfaces. These services give the subscriber the capacity required to transmit appropriate signals between certain access points, i.e. user network interfaces.

Bearer Services are categorized by three classes of attributes: dominant, secondary, and qualifying. These classes are further categorized by accessing services, interworking requirements, and other general characteristics.

The bearer services contain the following:

1. Rate adapted sub-rate information like circuit switched asynchronous and synchronous duplex data, 300–9600 bits.
2. Speech and data swapping during a call, i.e. alternate speech and data.
3. Modem selection, i.e. selection of 3.1 kHz audio service when inter-working with ISDN.
