= Primary Rate Interface =

Telecommunication standard

The Primary Rate Interface (PRI) is a telecommunications interface standard used on an Integrated Services Digital Network (ISDN) for carrying multiple DS0 voice and data transmissions between the network and a user.

PRI is the standard for providing telecommunication services to enterprises and offices. It is based on T-carrier (T1) transmission in the US, Canada, and Japan, while the E-carrier (E1) is common in Europe and Australia. The T1 line consists of 23 bearer (B) channels and one data (D) channel for control purposes, for a total bandwidth of 24x64-kbit/s or 1.544 Mbit/s. The E1 carrier provides 30 B- and one D-channel for a bandwidth of 2.048 Mbit/s. The first timeslot on the E1 is used for synchronization purposes and is not considered to be a B- or D-channel. The D-channel typically uses timeslot 16 on an E1, while it is timeslot 24 for a T1. Fewer active bearer channels, sometimes called user channels, may be used in fractional T1 or E1 services.

== ISDN service types ==
The Integrated Services Digital Network (ISDN) prescribes two levels of service:

- Basic Rate Interface (BRI): one 16-kbit/s D channel with two 64-kbit/s B channels, intended for small enterprises and residential service.
- Primary Rate Interface (PRI): one 64-kbit/s D channel with 23 (1.544 Mbit/s T1, a.k.a. "23B + D") or 30 (2.048 Mbit/s E1, a.k.a. "30B + D") 64-kbit/s B channels, intended for large organizations.

Each B-channel carries data, voice, and other services. The D-channel carries control and signaling information. Larger connections are possible using PRI pairing. A dual T1-PRI could have 24 + 23 = 47 B-channels and 1 D-channel (often called "47B + D"), but more commonly has 46 B-channels and 2 D-channels thus providing a backup signaling channel. The concept applies to E1s as well and both can include more than 2 PRIs. When configuring multiple T1's as ISDN-PRI's, it's possible to use NFAS (non-facility associated signaling) to enable one or two D-channels to support additional B-channels on separate T1 circuits.

== Application ==
The Primary Rate Interface channels are typically used by medium to large enterprises with digital private branch exchange (PBX) telephone systems to provide digital access to the public switched telephone network (PSTN). The B-channels may be used flexibly and reassigned when necessary to meet special needs such as video conferences.

PRI channels and direct inward dialing are also common as a means of delivering inbound calls to voice over IP gateways from the PSTN.

== See also ==
- Non-Facility Associated Signalling
- H channel
- I.431
- Caller ID spoofing
