= Voice engine =

A voice engine is a software subsystem for bidirectional audio communication, typically used as part of a communications system to simulate a telephone. It functions like a data pump for audio data, specifically voice data. The voice engine is typically used in an embedded system.

The term became popularized after 2000 with the proliferation of voice over internet protocol technology in software DSP systems. Voice engines handle the voice processing for an IP Phone system on a standard processor, compared to prior generations of systems which required dedicated, math-optimized digital signal processor chips.

Voice engines are highly optimized software subsystems due to the mathematically complex signal processing required for voice filtering and speech coding. The filter stages and coding elements within a voice engine are designed to work in conjunction with a larger communications system, including only a specific and limited range of processing to minimize the voice engine's memory size and processor usage. Compared to software desktop applications which might employ plugins to continually add flexibility or extensibility, a voice engine is designed to meet specific industry standards for interoperability.
