= Broadband Integrated Services Digital Network =

High-speed Internet access standard

In the 1980s, the telecommunications industry expected that digital services would follow much the same pattern as voice services did on the public switched telephone network, and conceived an end-to-end circuit switched service, known as Broadband Integrated Services Digital Network (B-ISDN).

== History ==
Before B-ISDN, the original ISDN attempted to substitute the analog telephone system with a digital system which was appropriate for both voice and non-voice traffic. Obtaining worldwide agreement on the basic rate interface standard was expected to lead to a large user demand for ISDN equipment, hence leading to mass production and inexpensive ISDN chips. However, the standardization process took years while computer network technology moved rapidly. Once the ISDN standard was finally agreed upon and products were available, it was already obsolete. For home use the largest demand for new services was video and voice transfer, but the ISDN basic rate lacks the necessary channel capacity.

This led to introduction of B-ISDN, by adding the word broadband. Although the term had a meaning in physics and engineering (similar to wideband), the CCITT defined it as: "Qualifying a service or system requiring transmission channels capable of supporting rates greater than the primary rate" referring to the primary rate which ranged from about 1.5 to 2 Mbit/s. Services envisioned included video telephone and video conferencing. Technical papers were published in early 1988. Standards were issued by the Comité Consultatif International Téléphonique et Télégraphique (CCITT, now known as ITU-T), and called "Recommendations". They included G.707 to G.709, and I.121 which defined the principal aspects of B-ISDN, with many others following through the 1990s.

The designated technology for B-ISDN was Asynchronous Transfer Mode (ATM), which was intended to carry both synchronous voice and asynchronous data services on the same transport. The B-ISDN vision has been overtaken by other disruptive technologies used in the Internet. The ATM technology survived as a low-level layer in most digital subscriber line (DSL) technologies, and as a payload type in some wireless technologies such as WiMAX. The term "broadband" became a marketing term for any digital Internet access service.

== See also ==
- Broadband networks
- Dynamic synchronous transfer mode, a revival of circuit switching technology for broadband traffic
