= Q.931 =

ITU-T recommendation

- ISDN user-network interface layer 3 specification for basic call control
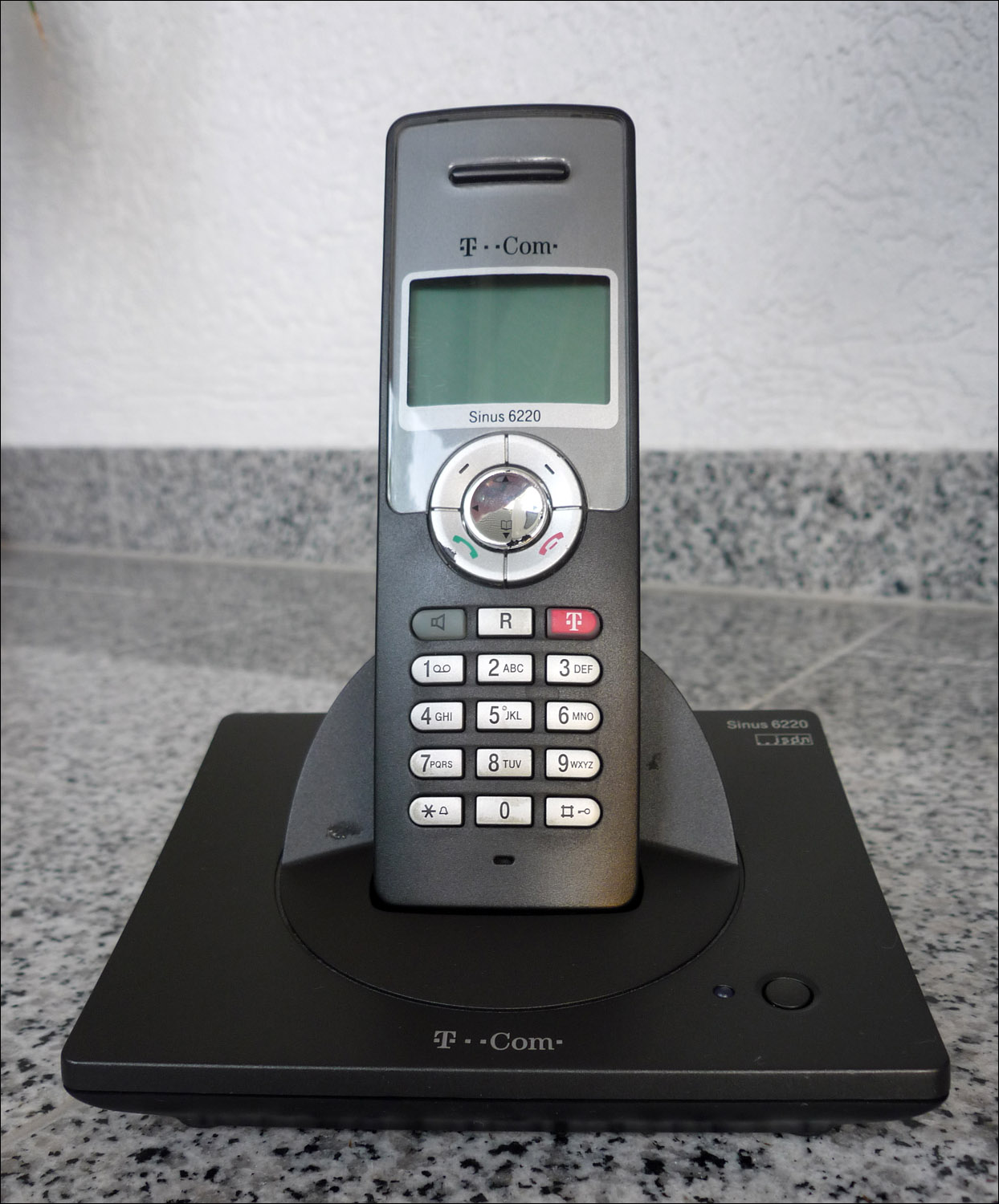
- Status: In force
- Year started: 1988
- Latest version: (05/98); May 1998
- Organization: ITU-T
- Related standards: H.323
- Website: https://www.itu.int/rec/T-REC-Q.931

ITU-T Recommendation Q.931 is the ITU standard ISDN connection control signalling protocol, forming part of Digital Subscriber Signalling System No. 1. Unlike connectionless systems like UDP, ISDN is connection oriented and uses explicit signalling to manage call state: Q.931. Q.931 typically does not carry user data. Q.931 does not have a direct equivalent in the Internet Protocol stack, but can be compared to SIP. Q.931 does not provide flow control or perform retransmission, since the underlying layers are assumed to be reliable and the circuit-oriented nature of ISDN allocates bandwidth in fixed increments of 64 kbit/s. Amongst other things, Q.931 manages connection setup and breakdown. Like TCP, Q.931 documents both the protocol itself and a protocol state machine.

Q.931 was designed for ISDN call establishment, maintenance, and release of network connections between two DTEs on the ISDN D channel. Q.931 has more recently been used as part of the VoIP H.323 protocol stack (see H.225.0) and in modified form in some mobile phone transmission systems and in ATM.

A Q.931 frame contains the following elements:

- Protocol discriminator (PD) – Specifies which signaling protocol is used for the connection (e.g. PD=8 for DSS1)
- Call reference value (CR) – Addresses different connections which can exist simultaneously. The value is valid only during the actual time period of the connection
- Message type (MT) – Specifies the type of a layer 3 message out of the Q.931-defined Message type set for call control (e.g. SETUP). There are messages defined for the call setup, the call release and the control of call features.
- Information elements (IE) – Specify further information which is associated to the actual message. An IE contains the IE name (e.g. bearer capability), their length and a variable field of contents.

== Message examples ==
Messages typically control or report the status of connections. For example:

- SETUP (indicating the establishment of a connection)
- CALL PROCEEDING (indicating that the call is being processed by the destination terminal)
- ALERTING (tells the calling party that the destination terminal is ringing)
- CONNECT (sent back to the calling party indicating that the intended destination has answered the call)
- DISCONNECT (sent to indicate a request to terminate the connection, by the end that seeks to terminate)
- RELEASE (sent in response to the disconnect request indicating that the call is to be terminated).
- RELEASE COMPLETE (sent by the receiver of the release to complete the handshake).
- RESTART (Reset D Channel to idle)

== Disconnect causes ==
Hex	Decimal	Cause
0x1	1	Unallocated or unassigned number
0x2	2	No route to specified transit network (Transit Network Identity)
0x3	3	No route to destination
0x4	4	Send special information tone
0x5	5	Misdialled trunk prefix
0x6	6	Channel unacceptable
0x7	7	Call awarded and being delivered in an established channel
0x8	8	Prefix 0 dialed but not allowed
0x9	9	Prefix 1 dialed but not allowed
0xA	10	Prefix 1 not dialed but required
0xB	11	More digits received than allowed, call is proceeding
0x10	16	Normal call clearing
0x11	17	User busy
0x12	18	No user responding
0x13	19	T.301 expired: – User Alerted, No answer from user
0x15	21	Call rejected
0x16	22	Number changed to number in diagnostic field.
0x17	23	Reverse charging rejected
0x18	24	Call suspended
0x19	25	Call resumed
0x1A	26	Non-selected user clearing
0x1B	27	Destination out of order
0x1C	28	Invalid number format or incomplete address
0x1D	29	EKTS facility rejected by network
0x1E	30	Response to STATUS ENQUIRY
0x1F	31	Normal, unspecified
0x21	33	Circuit out of order
0x22	34	No circuit/channel available
0x23	35	Destination unattainable
0x24	36	Out of order
0x25	37	Degraded service
0x26	38	Network out of order
0x27	39	Transit delay range cannot be achieved
0x28	40	Throughput range cannot be achieved
0x29	41	Temporary failure
0x2A	42	Switching equipment congestion
0x2B	43	Access information discarded
0x2C	44	Requested circuit channel not available
0x2D	45	Preempted
0x2E	46	Precedence call blocked
0x2F	47	Resource unavailable, unspecified
0x31	49	Quality of service unavailable
0x32	50	Requested facility not subscribed
0x33	51	Reverse charging not allowed
0x34	52	Outgoing calls barred
0x35	53	Outgoing calls barred within CUG
0x36	54	Incoming calls barred
0x37	55	Incoming calls barred within CUG
0x38	56	Call waiting not subscribed
0x39	57	Bearer capability not authorized
0x3A	58	Bearer capability not presently available
0x3F	63	Service or option not available, unspecified
0x41	65	Bearer service not implemented
0x42	66	Channel type not implemented
0x43	67	Transit network selection not implemented
0x44	68	Message not implemented
0x45	69	Requested facility not implemented
0x46	70	Only restricted digital information bearer capability is available
0x4F	79	Service or option not implemented, unspecified
0x51	81	Invalid call reference value
0x52	82	Identified channel does not exist
0x53	83	A suspended call exists, but this call identity does not
0x54	84	Call identity in use
0x55	85	No call suspended
0x56	86	Call having the requested call identity has been cleared
0x57	87	Called user not member of CUG
0x58	88	Incompatible destination
0x59	89	Non-existent abbreviated address entry
0x5A	90	Destination address missing, and direct call not subscribed
0x5B	91	Invalid transit network selection (national use)
0x5C	92	Invalid facility parameter 93 Mandatory information element is missing
0x5D	93	Message type non-existent or not implemented
0x5F	95	Invalid message, unspecified
0x60	96	Mandatory information element is missing
0x61	97	Message type non-existent or not implemented
0x62	98	Message not compatible with call state or message type non-existent or not implemented
0x63	99	Information element nonexistent or not implemented
0x64	100	Invalid information element contents
0x65	101	Message not compatible with call state
0x66	102	Recovery on timer expiry
0x67	103	Parameter non-existent or not implemented – passed on
0x6F	111	Protocol error, unspecified
0x7F	127	Internetworking, unspecified
0x80+	128 or higher	Proprietary diagnostic code (not necessarily bad). Typically used to pass proprietary control or maintenance messages between multiplexers.

== Q.2931 ==
Q.2931 is a modified and extended variant of Q.931 for use on BISDN or ATM networks. Q.2931 fulfils a purpose within BISDN similar to that of Q.931 in ISDN. Whilst ISDN allocates bandwidth in fixed 64k increments, BISDN/ATM incorporates an elaborate traffic management scheme, allowing precise specification of virtual circuit traffic parameters such as peak and mean bandwidth, jitter, cell loss ratio and so on. In order that ATM switches can manage bandwidth allocation in the network, encodings to express these parameters were added in Q.2931.

Unlike Q.931, although Q.2931 was implemented by many switch manufacturers, it was never widely deployed.
