= 56 kbit/s line =

Digital connection matching the data rate of a digital telephone line

A 56 kbit/s line is a digital connection capable of carrying 56 kilobits per second (kbit/s), or 56,000 bit/s, the data rate of a classical single channel digital telephone line in North America. Since the wide deployment of faster, cheaper technologies, 56 kbit/s lines are generally considered to be an obsolete technology.

== Speed derivation ==
The figure of 56 kbit/s is derived from its implementation using the same digital infrastructure used since the 1960s for digital telephony in the public switched telephone network, which uses a sampling rate of 8,000 Hz for PCM audio with 8-bit audio bit depth to encode analogue signals into a digital stream of 64,000 bit/s. However, in the T-carrier systems used in the US and Canada, a technique called bit-robbing uses, in every sixth frame, the least significant bit for Channel Associated Signaling (CAS). This effectively renders the lowest bit of the 8 speech bits unusable for data transmission, and so a 56 kbit/s line uses only 7 of the 8 data bits in each sample period to send data, thus giving a data rate of 8 kHz × 7 bits = 56 kbit/s.

== See also ==
- 56 kbit/s modem
- DS0
- ISDN
- ITU-T V.90
- Switch56
