= Aculab =

- Company type: Private
- Industry: Telecommunication
- Founded: 1978; 48 years ago
- Founder: Alan Pound
- Headquarters: Milton Keynes, UK
- Key people: Ladan Baghai-Ravary (CEO)
- Owner: Enghouse Holdings UK Limited
- Parent: Enghouse Systems
- Website: www.aculab.com

Aculab is a privately held, UK-based limited company that was founded in 1978. With headquarters and R&D facilities located in Milton Keynes, UK, and its branch office is in Norwood, Massachusetts, US.

Ladan Baghai-Ravary is the company CEO.

It is a designer, developer and manufacturer that specialises in providing API-driven, enabling technology sub-systems for telecommunications related OEM products such as are used in fixed line PSTN, wireless and VoIP networks. Its products are sold worldwide, primarily through direct sales and also via the reseller channel.

== Company history ==
In 1978, Aculab was a design consultancy involved in the music industry. Soon after the first microprocessors were introduced, it began to design and manufacture intelligent interfaces and controllers for computer peripherals. In 1988, Aculab turned to building analogue speech processing sub-systems for a number of clients, such as British Telecom.

In 1991, Aculab began to ship the first E1 interface cards for the UK and German markets. These PC Industry Standard Architecture (ISA) form factor cards enabled PC-based speech processing products to be connected to digital public switched telephone network (PSTN) networks. The expansion of its product capabilities to include the physical interfaces and telecommunications protocols (Integrated Services Digital Network (ISDN), channel-associated signaling (CAS) and Signaling System 7 (SS7)) needed to reach a broader, worldwide market, helped to establish Aculab as one of the pioneers of the computer telephony industry.

Later, in 1997, Aculab introduced its own ISA speech processing board, the first of its portfolio of digital signal processor (DSP)-based voice boards. And it was in 1998 that Aculab introduced a Peripheral Component Interconnect (PCI) product, the first combined trunk card and voice board – Prosody PCI. It was novel for its time, delivering up to 240 speech channels and 4 E1/T1 trunk interfaces on a single card at a time when the standard was 24 to 30 channels. A Prosody cPCI (CompactPCI) version followed in 2000.

During 1993, Aculab introduced Groomer, a protocol converter that enabled interconnection between disparate telephone networks running incompatible protocols. In 2002, the product was relaunched as GroomerII, a signalling and media gateway that can be used for connection between equipment and applications deployed in time-division multiplexing (TDM) and Internet Protocol (IP) networks. Aculab's GIII gateway is the third generation evolution in the product line.

In 2003, Aculab introduced Prosody S, a host media processing (HMP) alternative to traditional, DSP-based voice boards, for IP-based OEM products. In 2011, four years after launching the ApplianX range of gateways, it launched Aculab Cloud - a cloud-based telephony API service platform.

In December 2024, the firm was acquired by the British subsidiary controlled by Enghouse Systems.

== Currently offered products ==
=== Prosody X ===
Prosody X is a DSP-based media processing platform that offers the low level functions and technologies typically used by OEMs in their end-user product lines. Those enabling technologies include VoIP, SIP, fax, conferencing, and narrow and wideband (HD Voice) codecs. Aculab's DSP-based platforms include integral E1/T1 interfaces with CAS, ISDN and SS7 signalling and protocol support. Aculab's SS7 stack includes ISUP, signalling monitoring, and non-call related TCAP signalling functionality.

=== Prosody S ===
Prosody S is an IP-based, software-only host media processing (HMP) product that offers a range of media server technologies, including VoIP, SIP, T.38 fax, conferencing, and narrow and wideband (HD Voice) codecs, under a software licence.

=== The GIII gateway ===
The GIII gateway is a signalling and media gateway, primarily intended for the service provider and the Emergency_service markets. The gateway enables interworking between SIP-based networks or ESInets, applications and entities, and legacy, TDM-based wired and wireless networks running CAS, ISDN or SS7 (C7) protocols. The GIII gateway is the successor to Aculab's long-established GroomerII gateway, and was introduced in the spring of 2018.

=== ApplianX ===
The ApplianX IP Gateway is an enterprise scale gateway offering interoperability between SIP-based networks and entities, TDM-based PBXs and the PSTN. The gateway includes SIP, QSIG and DPNSS interworking functionality, with Supplementary Services support, which capability is needed by the legacy enterprise PBX/IP-PBX market in the UK (with DPNSS) and elsewhere (with QSIG).

=== Aculab Cloud ===
Aculab Cloud is a telephony API platform-as-a-service that presents the user with Java, Python, C# (.NET), and RESTful APIs, enabling interactive voice, fax, speech technologies (ASR and TTS), and messaging applications to be written in high-level, general purpose programming languages. Developers can use Aculab Cloud to add telephony functions to their business applications or create telephony services or applications such as: IVR; conferencing; voicemail; broadcast fax; SMS; voice messaging services; PBXs; and predictive diallers.

=== VoiSentry ===
VoiSentry is an API-driven Speaker recognition system that enables verifying by voice in applications where there is a need to remotely authenticate callers' identities. VoiSentry was announced in 2017 and is available as 'GA' from Q2-2018.
