= Error rate =

Error rate, meaning the frequency of errors, can have the following uses:

- Bayes error rate
- Bit error rate
- Per-comparison error rate
- Residual bit error rate
- Soft error rate
- Technique for human error-rate prediction
- Viterbi error rate
- Word error rate

== See also ==
- Failure rate
