= Ternary signal =

In telecommunications, a ternary signal is a signal that can assume, at any given instant, one of three states or significant conditions, such as power level, phase position, pulse duration, or frequency.

Examples of ternary signals are (a) a pulse that can have a positive, zero, or negative voltage value at any given instant (PAM-3), (b) a sine wave that can assume phases of 0°, 120°, or 240° relative to a clock pulse (3-PSK), and (c) a carrier signal that can assume any one of three different frequencies depending on three different modulation signal significant conditions (3-FM).

Some examples of PAM-3 line codes that use ternary signals are:

- hybrid ternary code
- bipolar encoding
- MLT-3 encoding used in 100BASE-TX Ethernet
- B3ZS
- 4B3T used in some ISDN basic rate interface
- 8B6T used in 100BASE-T4 Ethernet
- return-to-zero
- SOQPSK-TG uses ternary continuous phase modulation

3-PSK can be seen as falling between "binary phase-shift keying" (BPSK), which uses two phases, and "quadrature phase-shift keying" (QPSK), which uses four phases.

== See also ==
- Balanced ternary
- Digital signal (electronics)
- Fast Ethernet#100BASE-T2 uses PAM-5, which, like ternary, is one of the few modulation schemes that does not use a power-of-two number of symbols.
- Ternary computer
- Three-phase electric power, like 3-PSK, uses 3 phases at a single frequency and amplitude.
- Three-valued logic
