= HMP =

HMP may refer to:

== Science and technology ==
- Haughton–Mars Project
- Host media processing, a telephony processing technique
- Human Microbiome Project
- Harmonic mean p-value, a technique for combining statistical tests

=== Computing ===
- Heterogeneous multi-processing, internal use model of the ARM big.LITTLE architecture
- Host Monitoring Protocol, an obsolete TCP/IP protocol

== Other uses ==
- h.m.p. (Japan), a Japanese adult video company
- Hampton railway station (London), London, National Rail station code
- HM Prison, His/Her Majesty's Prison
- Northern Mashan Miao language, ISO 639-3 code
- Tommy Suharto (Hutomo Mandala Putra, abberivated HMP), Indonesian politician and businessman, youngest son of former Indonesian president Suharto

== See also ==
- HMPS (disambiguation)
