= Transmux =

TRANSMUX (Transcode-Multiplexing) is a signaling format change in telecommunications signaling between synchronous optical network signals SONET and asynchronous DS3 signals. A DS3 signal is multiplexed from 28 individual DS1 signals in a bit-interleaved fashion, with framing and overhead at determined intervals. SONET differs from this approach by using a byte-interleaved, synchronous, multiplexing technique with several variations on payload types.

== Usage ==
SONET payload can carry multiplexed lower rate streams (DS1, E1, DS3, etc.) as well as any octet-based format such as TCP/IP, ATM, frame relay, Ethernet, etc.

== Variations ==
If cross-connect capability is to be maintained at the VT1.5 level, then the individual DS1 signals are extracted from a parent DS3 or electrical T1, and then transmuted individually into each VT1.5. If a complete DS3 signal is to be delivered to a SONET drop, then the entire DS3 is transmuted intact into an STS container and no subsequent cross-connect capability exists with the SONET payload at a VT1.5 level.

== Industry application ==
White Rock Networks Description of a product with Transmux Support:

"For applications where conversion between DS3 and VT1.5 mapped STS-1s is required, transmux allows DS3 embedded within an STS-1 circuit to be adapted to a VT1.5 mapped STS-1 without physically terminating the circuit as a DS3 or EC-1."
