= Bipolar =

Bipolar may refer to:

== Astronomy ==
- Bipolar nebula, a distinctive nebular formation
- Bipolar outflow, two continuous flows of gas from the poles of a star

== Mathematics ==
- Bipolar coordinates, a two-dimensional orthogonal coordinate system
- Bipolar set, a derivative of a polar set
- Bipolar theorem, a theorem in convex analysis which provides necessary and sufficient conditions for a cone to be equal to its bipolar

== Medicine ==
- Bipolar disorder, a mental disorder that causes periods of depression and periods of elevated mood
  - Bipolar I disorder, a bipolar spectrum disorder characterized by the occurrence of at least one manic or mixed episode
  - Bipolar II disorder, a bipolar spectrum disorder characterized by at least one episode of hypomania and at least one episode of major depression
  - Bipolar disorder not otherwise specified, a diagnosis for bipolar disorder when it does not fall within the other established sub-types
- Bipolar neuron, a type of neuron which has two extensions

== Music ==
=== Albums ===
- Bipolar (Up Dharma Down album), 2008
- Bi-Polar (Vanilla Ice album), 2001
- Bipolar, a 2009 album by rock group El Cuarteto de Nos
- Bipolar, a 2019 EP by American singer-songwriter Yot Club

=== Songs ===
- "Bipolar" (song), a 2023 song by Peso Pluma, Jasiel Nuñez, and Junior H
- "Bipolar", a song by Blonde Redhead from their 1997 album Fake Can Be Just as Good
- "Bipolar", a song by Gloria Trevi from her 2013 album De Película
- "Bipolar", a song by Gucci Mane from his 2018 album Evil Genius
- "Bipolar", a 2019 song by Kiiara
- "Bi Polar", a 2021 song by Bhad Bhabie
- "Bipolar", a song by Wifiskeleton from his mixtape Pony

== Technology ==
- Bipolar electricity transmission, using a pair of conductors in opposite polarity
- Bipolar encoding, a type of line code where two nonzero values are used
  - Bipolar violation, a violation of the bipolar encoding rules
- Bipolar electric motor, an electric motor with only two poles to its stationary field
  - Bipolar (locomotive), a locomotive using a bipolar electric motor
- Bipolar signal, a signal that may assume either of two polarities, neither of which is zero
- Lithic reduction: Bipolar percussion (archaeology)

=== Transistors ===
- Bipolar junction transistor (BJT)
- Heterojunction bipolar transistor (HBT)
- Insulated-gate bipolar transistor (IGBT)

== Other uses ==
- Bipolarisation or Bipolarity, polarity in international relations involving two states

== See also ==
- Dipole (disambiguation)
