= Bipolarity =

Bipolarity may refer to:

- Polarity in international relations
- Bipolar disorder in psychiatry
- An object with an electromagnetic field which is not a magnetic monopole
- A dipole antenna in radio broadcasting

== See also ==
- Bipolar (disambiguation)
