= Commutation (telemetry) =

Processes of combining telemetry streams for transmission

A sequence of minor frames (rows) including a subcommutated measurand (word WD2, in blue, sampled at half the frame rate and transmitted in alternating minor frames) and a supercommutated measurand (word WD4, in orange, sampled at twice the frame rate and thus included twice in each minor frame)

In telemetry, commutation is a process whereby multiple data streams ("measurands"), possibly with differing data rates, are combined into a single frame-based stream for transmission, before being separated again (decommutated) upon reception; it is a form of time-division multiplexing. Frame synchronization must be achieved before a data stream can be decommutated.

== Etymology ==
Commutation is named by analogy with electric commutators, which engage multiple electrical contacts in sequence as they rotate; similarly, telemetry commutation involves sampling a sequence of data sources in turn, before returning to the first data source. Hardware or software which performs commutation is referred to as a commutator; its opposite at the receiving end is a decommutator. Dedicated hardware generally supports faster commutation and decommutation than software on a general purpose architecture.

== Mechanism ==
A set of data words, together with synchronization and ID or counter words, constitute a minor frame; a set number of minor frames are combined to form a major frame. Measurands occupy fixed positions within each major frame, with these positions defined in a database, allowing them to be extracted. Measurands may be sampled multiple times within each minor frame (supercommutation), or they may only be sampled once in several frames (subcommutation), depending on the required data rate for each measurand.

Commutated frames may also contain asynchronous data, which require further processing to extract.

Decommutators may be equipped to handle multiple frame formats, containing different sets of measurands in different positions, for use in different operating modes; a switch in format may be signaled with a specific measurand. Translators exist to allow support for equipment-specific database formats.

Decommutated measurand values may be stored in a "current value table" or other architecture.

== See also ==
- Serialization
