= Digital Signal Designation =

Digital Signal Designation is the classification of digital bit rates in the digital multiplex hierarchy used in transport of signals from one location to another in telecommunications.

The DS technically refers to the rate and format of the signal, while the T designation refers to the equipment providing the signals. In practice, "DS" and "T" are used synonymously; for example, DS1 and T1, DS3 and T3.

== Digital signal line rates ==
=== North America ===
| Digital Signal Designation | Bandwidth/data rate | Channels (DS0s) | Carrier designation |
|---|---|---|---|
| DS0 | 64 kbit/s | 1 | |
| DS1 | 1.544 Mbit/s | 24 | T1 |
| DS1 | 3.152 Mbit/s | 48 | T1c |
| DS2 | 6.312 Mbit/s | 96 | T2 |
| DS3 | 44.736 Mbit/s | 672 | T3 |
| DS4 | 274.176 Mbit/s | 4032 | T4 |
| DS5 | 400.352 Mbit/s | 5760 | T5 |

=== Europe ===
| Digital Signal Designation | Bandwidth/data rate | Channels (SL0s) | Carrier designation |
|---|---|---|---|
| Signal Level 0 | 64 kbit/s | 1 | |
| SL1 | 2.048 Mbit/s | 30 | E1 |
| SL2 | 8.448 Mbit/s | 120 | E2 |
| SL3 | 34.368 Mbit/s | 480 | E3 |
| SL4 | 139.264 Mbit/s | 1920 | E4 |
| SL5 | 565.148 Mbit/s | 7680 | E5 |

=== Optical carrier ===
See SONET for more information.
