= VT1.5 =

VT1.5 is a type of virtual tributary in SONET.

SONET bandwidth is defined in multiples of an OC-1/STS-1, each of which can transport up to 51.84 Mbit/s. However, it is frequently desirable to address much smaller portions of bandwidth. To meet this need, sub-STS-1 facilities called Virtual Tributaries have been defined. In North America and Japan, the VT1.5 is the most common virtual tributary because it can carry 1.544 Mbit/s; just enough room for a DS1/T1 signal. In Europe, the VT2 (with a data rate of 2.304 Mbit/s) is used to transport E1s.

Some SONET manufacturers offer products that can switch at the VT1.5 level. Such equipment is able to re-arrange the data payloads so that inbound VT1.5s are placed into a completely different set of outbound STS's than the ones they arrived in. Among other things, this allows the bandwidth usage to be optimized and facilitates a cleaner network design.

The following is provided via Network Infrastructure/Design Student:

Four types of VT's defined in SONET

- VT 1.5 (DS-1: 1.544 Mbit/s)
- VT 2 (E-1: 2.048 Mbit/s)
- VT 3 (DS-1C: 3.152 Mbit/s)
- VT 6 (DS-2: 6.312 Mbit/s)

7 VT groups (VTG) per STS-1.

- Four DS-1s map into one VTG.
- One STS-1 frame can carry 28 DS-1s
- DS-3 Maps directly to STS-1. VT are not needed.
