= Prefix =

Affix which is placed before the stem of a word

A comparison of prepositions and directional prefixes in Greek, Latin, English, and German

A prefix is an affix which is placed before the stem and before the suffix of a word. Particularly in the study of languages, a prefix is also called a preformative, because it alters the form of the word to which it is affixed.

Prefixes, like other affixes, can be either inflectional, creating a new form of a word with the same basic meaning and same lexical category, or derivational, creating a new word with a new semantic meaning and sometimes also a different lexical category. Prefixes, like all affixes, are usually bound morphemes.

English has no inflectional prefixes, using only suffixes for that purpose. Adding a prefix to the beginning of an English word changes it to a different word. For example, when the prefix un- is added to the word happy, it creates the word unhappy.

The word prefix is itself made up of the stem fix (meaning "attach", in this case), and the prefix pre- (meaning "before"), both of which are derived from Latin roots.

== English language ==
=== List of English derivational prefixes ===
This is a fairly comprehensive, although not exhaustive, list of derivational prefixes in English. Depending on precisely how one defines a derivational prefix, some of the neoclassical combining forms may or may not qualify for inclusion in such a list. This list takes the broad view that acro- and auto- count as English derivational prefixes because they function the same way like that of prefixes such as over- and self- do.

As for numeral prefixes, only the most common members of that class are included here. There is a large separate table covering them all at Numeral prefix > Table of number prefixes in English.

| Prefix | Meaning | Example | Comments |
|---|---|---|---|
| a- | "not" | asymmetric, "not symmetric" | takes the form an- before vowels; see privative alpha |
| acro- | "high" | acrophobia, "fear of heights" (more) | |
| allo- | "other" | allotransplantation, "transplant of tissue from another person" (more) | |
| alter- | "other" | alter ego, "other personality" (more) | |
| ante- | "prior" | antebellum, "before a war" | |
| anti- | "opposite" | anti-inflammatory, "against inflammation" (more) | |
| auto- | "by oneself or itself" | automobile, "moves itself" (more) | |
| bi- | "two" | bicentennial, "consisting of or occurring every two centuries" binomial, "two terms" | See number prefixes in English |
| co- | "together" | cooperation, "working together" | takes the form con- before vowels |
| cis- | "on the same side" | cisgenesis, "genes don't change within breeding and birth setting" | |
| contra- | "below"; "against" | contraindication, "against indication" (more) | |
| counter- | "against" | countermeasure, "action against" (more) | |
| de- | "negative, remove" | deactivate, "stop from working" | |
| di- | "two" | diatomic, "two atoms" dipole, "two poles" | See number prefixes in English |
| dis- | "negative, remove" | disappear, "vanish" (more) | |
| down- | "down"; "reduce" | downshift, "shift to a lower gear" downregulation, "regulation toward lessened expression" (more) | |
| dys- | "negative, badly, wrongly" | dysfunction, "bad function" (more) | |
| epi- | "upon addition", "above" | epidural, "outside the dura mater" (more) | |
| extra- | "to a greater extent"; "beyond" | extracellular, "outside a cell" (more) | |
| fore- | "before" | foresight, "seeing beforehand" (more) | |
| hemi- | "half" | hemisphere, "half of a sphere" (more) | See number prefixes in English |
| hexa- | "six" | hexagon, "six-sided polygon" (more) | See number prefixes in English |
| hyper- | "beyond" | hypercalcemia, "too much calcium in the blood" (more) | See hyper |
| hypo- | "marginal"; "not enough" | hypokalemia, "not enough potassium in the blood" (more) | |
| ig- | "not" | ignoble, "not noble" ignorant, (from roots meaning) "not knowing" (more) | ig- (before gn- or n-), il- (before l-), im- (before b-, m-, or p-), in- (before most letters), or ir- (before r-) |
| il- | "not" | illegal, "not legal" (more) | ig- (before gn- or n-), il- (before l-), im- (before b-, m-, or p-), in- (before most letters), or ir- (before r-) |
| im- | "not" | imbalance, "lack of balance" (more) | ig- (before gn- or n-), il- (before l-), im- (before b-, m-, or p-), in- (before most letters), or ir- (before r-) |
| in- | "not" | inactive, "not active" | ig- (before gn- or n-), il- (before l-), im- (before b-, m-, or p-), in- (before most letters), or ir- (before r-) |
| infra- | "below" | infrared, "below red on the spectrum" (more) | |
| inter- | "between" | interobserver, "between observers" (more) | |
| intra- | "within" | intracellular, "inside a cell" (more) | |
| ir- | "not" | irregular, "not regular" (more) | ig- (before gn- or n-), il- (before l-), im- (before b-, m-, or p-), in- (before most letters), or ir- (before r-) |
| macro- | "large-scale"; "exceptionally prominent" | macroeconomics, "workings of entire economies" (more) | |
| mal- | "unpleasant", "not" | malocclusion, "bad occlusion" (more) | |
| maxi- | "big", "as big as possible" | maxi-single, "single with extras" (more) | |
| meso- | "middle" | mesoamerican, "middle of the Americas" (more) | |
| meta- | "self-referential" | metadata, "data that provides information about other data" (more) | |
| micro- | "small-scale" | micrometer, "small-measurement instrument" (more) | |
| mid- | "middle" | midportion, "middle part" (more) | |
| mini- | "small" | miniature, "small"; "smaller version" (more) | |
| mis- | "bad", "wrong" | misspelling, "incorrect spelling" (more) | |
| mono- | "one" | monotheism, "belief in one god" (more) | See number prefixes in English |
| multi- | "many", "more than one" | multiplex, "many signals in one circuit" (more) | |
| non- | "no", "not" | nonstop, "without stopping" (more) | |
| octo- | "eight" | octopus, "eight-footed" (more) | See number prefixes in English |
| over- | "excess", "too much"; "on top" | overexpression, "too much expression" overcoat, "outer coat" (more) | |
| pan- | "all" | pancytopenia, "low counts across all [blood] cell types" Pan-American, "involving all of the Americas" pansexual, "sexually attracted to people of all genders" (more) | Sometimes "all-" is used, especially in Asian English, where All-Union was a standard translation of the Russian word meaning "pan-USSR" or "USSR-wide", and "All-India" is a similar standard term in India, comparable to words such as national, nationwide, or federal (in the case of federations). |
| para- | "beside"; "beyond"; "related to"; "altered" | paranormal, "beyond the normal" paresthesia, "altered sensation" paramilitary, "military-like" (more) | |
| penta- | "five" | pentateuch, "the five books of Moses" (more) | See number prefixes in English |
| per- | "through"; "throughout" | percutaneous, "through the skin" (more) | |
| peri- | "around" | pericardial, "around the heart" (more) | |
| poly- | "many" | polyglot, "many languages" (more) | |
| post- | "after" | postoperative, "after surgery" (more) | |
| pre- | "before"; "already" | preassembled, "already built" (more) | |
| pro- | "on behalf of"; "before" | pro-science, "in favor of science" (more) | |
| proto- | "first"; "primitive"; "precursor" | Proto-Indo-European, "precursor of Indo-European" prototype, "first or prime example" (more) | |
| pseudo- | "false", "specious" | pseudonym, "fake name" (more) | |
| quadri- | "four" | quadrilateral, "four-sided" (more) | See number prefixes in English |
| quasi- | "somewhat", "resembling" | quasiparticulate, "resembling particles" (more) | |
| re- | "again" | reestablish, "establish again" (more) | |
| self- | "[acting on or by] oneself" | self-cleaning, "cleans itself" (more) | By normative convention, always hyphenated (except for a few multiprefix compounds such as unselfconscious) |
| semi- | "partial"; "somewhat"; "half" | semiarid, "somewhat arid" (more) | See number prefixes in English |
| sub- | "below" | subzero, "below zero" (more) | |
| super- | "above"; "more than"; "great" | supermarket, "big market" (more) | |
| supra- | "above" | supraorbital, "above the eye sockets" (more) | |
| tetra- | "four" | tetravalent, "four valence electrons" (more) | See number prefixes in English |
| trans- | "across"; "connecting" | transatlantic, "across the Atlantic Ocean" (more) | |
| tri- | "three" | tripartite, "three parts" (more) | |
| ultra- | "beyond"; "extremely" | ultraviolet, "beyond violet on the spectrum" (more) | |
| un- | "not"; "remove"; "opposite" | unopened, "not opened" (more) | |
| under- | "beneath"; "not enough" | underexposure, "not enough exposure" (more) | |
| up- | "up"; "increase" | upshift, "shift to a higher gear" upregulation, "regulation toward increased expression" (more) | |
| xeno- | "foreign" | xenophobia, "fear of strangers or foreigners" xenotransplantation, "transplant from another species" (more) | |

=== Hyphenation ===
The choice between hyphenation or solid styling for prefixes in English is covered at Hyphen > Prefixes and suffixes.

== Japanese language ==
Commonly used prefixes in Japanese include o- (お〜) and go- (ご〜). They are used as part of the honorific system of speech, and are used as markers for politeness, showing respect for the person or thing they are affixed to, notably also being used euphemistically.

== Bantu languages ==
In the Bantu languages of Africa, which are agglutinating, the noun class is conveyed through prefixes, which is declined and agrees with all of its arguments accordingly.

=== Example from Luganda ===
| Noun class | Prefix |
|---|---|
| 1 | o-mu- |
| 1a | ∅ |
| 2 | a-ba- |
| 3 | o-mu- |
| 4 | e-mi- |
| 5 | e-ri-/CC- |
| 6 | a-ma- |
| 7 | e-ki- |
| 8 | e-bi- |
| 9 | e-N- |
| 10 | e-N-/zi- |

ò-mú-límí ò-mú-néné ò-mú-kâddé ò-mú à-∅-gênda
AG-CL1-farmer AG-CL1-fat AG-CL1-old AG.one he-PRES-go
The one, old, fat farmer goes.

== Navajo ==
Verbs in the Navajo language are formed from a word stem and multiple affixes. For example, each verb requires one of four non-syllabic prefixes (∅, ł, d, l) to create a verb theme.

== Sunwar ==
In the Sunwar language of Eastern Nepal, the prefix ma- म is used to create negative verbs. It is the only verbal prefix in the language.

ma.rimʃo al
NEG.nice child
Bad child! (scolding)

== Russian ==
As a part of the formation of nouns, prefixes are less common in Russian than suffixes, but alter the meaning of a word.

пред- and положение 'position' becomes предположение 'supposition'
пре- and образование 'formation (verb)' becomes преобразование 'transformation'

== German ==
In German, derivatives formed with prefixes may be classified in two categories: those used with substantives and adjectives, and those used with verbs. For derivative substantives and adjectives, only two productive prefixes are generally addable to any substantive or adjective as of 1970: un-, which expresses negation (as in ungesund, from gesund), and ur-, which means "original, primitive" in substantives, and has an emphatic function in adjectives. ge-, on the other hand, expresses union or togetherness, but only in a closed group of words—it cannot simply be added to any noun or adjective.

Verbal prefixes commonly in use are be-, ent-, er-, ge-, miss-, ver-, and zer- (see also Separable verb). be- expresses strengthening or generalization. ent- expresses negation. ge- indicates the completion of an action, which is why its most common use has become the forming of the past participle of verbs; ver- has an emphatic function, or it is used to turn a substantive or an adjective into a verb. In some cases, the prefix particle ent- (negation) can be considered the opposite of particle be-, while er- can be considered the opposite of ver-.

The prefix er- usually indicates the successful completion of an action, and sometimes the conclusion means death. With fewer verbs, it indicates the beginning of an action. The prefix er- is also used to form verbs from adjectives (e.g. erkalten is equivalent to kalt werden which means "to get cold").

== See also ==
- Affix
- Suffix
- Privative
- Bound and unbound morphemes
- English prefix
- List of Greek and Latin roots in English
- Substring#Prefix
- Metric prefix
- Opcode prefix
