= DS4 =

DS4, DS-4, or variant, may refer to:

- DS 4, a subcompact hatchback car
- DS 4 (crossover), a car
- Datsun DS-4, a car
- DS4, a Digital Signal Designation
- Dalit Shoshit Samaj Sangharsh Samiti, or DS4, political organization in India
- DS4Ever, American rapper Gunna's third studio album.

== See also ==
- 4DS
- DualShock 4, PlayStation 4 game controller
