= Errored second =

Metric for digital communication link

In telecommunications and data communication systems, an errored second is an interval of a second during which any error whatsoever has occurred, regardless of whether that error was a single bit error or a complete loss of communication for that entire second. The type of error is not important for the purpose of counting errored seconds.

In communication systems with very low uncorrected bit error rates, such as modern fiber-optic transmission systems, or systems with higher low-level error rates that are corrected using large amounts of forward error correction, errored seconds are often a better measure of the effective user-visible error rate than the raw bit error rate.

For many modern packet-switched communication systems, even a single uncorrected bit error is enough to cause the loss of a data packet by causing its CRC check to fail; whether that packet loss was caused by a single bit error or a hundred-bit-long error burst is irrelevant.

For systems using large amounts of forward error correction, the reverse applies; a single low-level bit error will almost never occur, since any small errors will almost always be corrected, but any error sufficiently large to cause the forward error correction to fail will almost always result in a large burst error.

More specialist and precise definitions of errored seconds exist in standards such as the T1 and DS1 transport systems.
