= Modified AMI code =

Digital telecommunications technique

Modified AMI codes are a digital telecommunications technique to maintain system synchronization. Alternate mark inversion (AMI) line codes are modified by deliberate insertion of bipolar violations. There are several types of modified AMI codes, used in various T-carrier and E-carrier systems.

== Overview ==
The clock rate of an incoming T-carrier is extracted from its bipolar line code. Each signal transition provides an opportunity for the receiver to see the transmitter's clock. The AMI code guarantees that transitions are always present before and after each mark (1 bit), but are missing between adjacent spaces (0 bits). To prevent loss of synchronization when a long string of zeros is present in the payload, deliberate bipolar violations are inserted into the line code, to create a sufficient number of transitions to maintain synchronization; this is a form of run length limited coding. The receive terminal equipment recognizes the bipolar violations and removes from the user data the marks attributable to the bipolar violations.

T-carrier was originally developed for voice applications. When voice signals are digitized for transmission via T-carrier, the data stream always includes ample 1 bits to maintain synchronization. (To help this, the μ-law algorithm for digitizing voice signals encodes silence as a continuous stream of 1 bits.) However, when used for the transmission of digital data, the conventional AMI line code may fail to have sufficient marks to permit recovery of the incoming clock, and synchronization is lost. This happens when there are too many consecutive zeros in the user data being transported.

The exact pattern of bipolar violations that is transmitted in any given case depends on the line rate (i.e., the level of the line code in the T-carrier hierarchy) and the polarity of the last valid mark in the user data prior to the unacceptably long string of zeros. It would not be useful to have a violation immediately following a mark, as that would not produce a transition. For this reason, all modified AMI codes include a space (0 bit) before each violation mark.

In the descriptions below, "B" denotes a balancing mark with the opposite polarity to that of the preceding mark, while "V" denotes a bipolar violation mark, which has the same polarity as the preceding mark. In order to preserve AMI coding's desirable absence of DC bias, the number of positive marks must equal the number of negative marks. This happens automatically for balancing (B) marks, but the line code must ensure that positive and negative violation (V) marks balance each other.

== Zero length code suppression ==
The first technique used to ensure a minimum density of marks was zero code suppression a form of bit stuffing, which set the least significant bit of each 8-bit byte transmitted to a 1. (This bit was already unavailable due to robbed-bit signaling.) This avoided the need to modify the AMI code in any way, but limited available data rates to 56,000 bits per second per DS0 voice channel. Also, the low minimum density of ones (12.5%) sometimes led to increased clock slippage on the span.

Increased demand for bandwidth, and compatibility with the G.703 and ISDN PRI standards which called for 64,000 bits per second, led to this system being superseded by B8ZS.

== B8ZS (North American T1) ==
Commonly used in the North American T1 (Digital Signal 1) 1.544 Mbit/s line code, bipolar with eight-zero substitution (B8ZS) replaces each string of 8 consecutive zeros with the special pattern "000VB0VB". Depending on the polarity of the preceding mark, that could be 000+−0−+ or 000−+0+−.

== B6ZS (North American T2) ==
At the North American T2 rate (6.312 Mbit/s), bipolar violations are inserted if 6 or more consecutive zeros occur. This line code is called bipolar with six-zero substitution (B6ZS), and replaces 6 consecutive zeros with the pattern "0VB0VB". Depending on the polarity of the preceding mark, that could be 0+−0−+ or 0−+0+−.

== HDB3 (European E-carrier) ==
Used in all levels of the European E-carrier system, the high density bipolar of order 3 (HDB3) code replaces any instance of 4 consecutive 0 bits with one of the patterns "000V" or "B00V". The choice is made to ensure that consecutive violations are of differing polarity; i.e., separated by an odd number of normal + or − marks.

HDB 3 coding of 0000_{2}
Parity of +/− bits since previous V	Pattern	Previous pulse	Coded
Even	B00V	+	−00−
Even	B00V	−	+00+
Odd	000V	+	000+
Odd	000V	−	000-

These rules are applied on the code as it is being built from the original string. Every time there are 4 consecutive zeros in the code they will be replaced by either 000−, 000+, +00+ or −00−. To determine which pattern to use, one must count the number of pluses (+) and the number of minuses (−) since the last violation bit V, then subtract one from the other. If the result is an odd number then 000− or 000+ is used. If the result is an even number then +00+ or −00− is used. To determine which polarity to use, one must look at the pulse preceding the four zeros. If 000V form must be used then V simply copies the polarity of last pulse, if B00V form must be used then B and V chosen will have the opposite polarity of the last pulse.

=== Examples ===
Here are some examples of bit streams codes with AMI and HDB3. All assume the same starting conditions: the previous 1 bit was −, and the previous violation was an even number of 1 bits ago. (E.g. the preceding bits could have been ++−.)

Input	10000110_{2}
AMI	+0000−+0
HDB3	+B00V−+0
	+−00−+−0

Input	101000001100001100000001_{2}
AMI	+0−00000+−0000+−0000000+
HDB3	+0−000V0+−B00V−+B00V000+
	+0−000−0+−+00+−+−00−000+

Input	1010000100001100001110000111100001010000_{2}
AMI	+0−0000+0000−+0000−+−0000+−+−0000+0−0000
HDB3	+0-000V+000V-+B00V-+-000V+-+-B00V+0-B00V
	+0-000-+000+-+-00-+-+000+-+-+-00-+0-+00+

Input	10000000000_{2}
AMI	+000000000
HDB3	+B00VB00V00
	+-00-+00+00

== B3ZS (North American T3) ==
At the North American T3 rate (44.736 Mbit/s), bipolar violations are inserted if 3 or more consecutive zeros occur. This line code is called bipolar with three-zero substitution (B3ZS), and is very similar to HDB3. Each run of 3 consecutive zeros is replaced by "00V" or "B0V". The choice is made to ensure that consecutive violations are of differing polarity, i.e. separated by an odd number of normal B marks.

B3ZS coding of "000"
Number of B bits since last V	Pattern	Polarity of last B	Coded
Odd	00V	+	00+
Odd	00V	−	00−
Even	B0V	+	−0−
Even	B0V	−	+0+

== See also ==
Other line codes that have 3 states:

- Bipolar encoding or alternate mark inversion
- Hybrid ternary code
- MLT-3 encoding
- 4B3T
