= Comparison of T-carrier and E-carrier systems =

Comparison of T-carrier and E-carrier systems
System	North American	Japanese	European (CEPT)
Level zero (channel data rate)	64 kbit/s (DS0)	64 kbit/s	64 kbit/s
First level	1.544 Mbit/s (DS1) (24 user channels) (T1)	1.544 Mbit/s (24 user channels)	2.048 Mbit/s (32 user channels) (E1)
(Intermediate level, T-carrier hierarchy only)	3.152 Mbit/s (DS1C) (48 Ch.)	–	–
Second level	6.312 Mbit/s (DS2) (96 Ch.) (T2)	6.312 Mbit/s (96 Ch.), or 7.786 Mbit/s (120 Ch.)	8.448 Mbit/s (128 Ch.) (E2)
Third level	44.736 Mbit/s (DS3) (672 Ch.) (T3)	32.064 Mbit/s (480 Ch.)	34.368 Mbit/s (512 Ch.) (E3)
Fourth level	274.176 Mbit/s (DS4) (4032 Ch.)	97.728 Mbit/s (1440 Ch.)	139.264 Mbit/s (2048 Ch.) (E4)
Fifth level	400.352 Mbit/s (DS5) (5760 Ch.)	565.148 Mbit/s (8192 Ch.)	565.148 Mbit/s (8192 Ch.) (E5)

The DS designations are used in connection with the North American hierarchy only. Strictly speaking, a DS1 is the data carried on a T1 circuit, and likewise for a DS3 and a T3, but in practice the terms are used interchangeably.

There are other data rates in use, e.g., military systems that operate at six and eight times the DS1 rate. At least one manufacturer has a commercial system that operates at 90 Mbit/s, twice the DS3 rate. New systems, which take advantage of the high data rates offered by optical communications links, are also deployed or are under development. Higher data rates are now often achieved by using synchronous optical networking (SONET) or synchronous digital hierarchy (SDH).

A DS3 is delivered native on a copper trunk. DS3 may be converted to an optical fiber run when needing longer distances between termination points. When a DS3 is delivered over fiber it is still an analog type trunk connection at the termination points. When delivering data over an OC3 or greater SONET is used. A DS3 transported over SONET is encapsulated in a STS-1 SONET channel. An OC-3 SONET link contains three STS-1s, and therefore may carry three DS3s. Likewise, OC-12, OC-48, and OC-192 may carry 12, 48, and 192 DS3s respectively.
