= Dipole moment =

Dipole moment may refer to:

- Electric dipole moment, the measure of the electrical polarity of a system of charges
  - Transition dipole moment, the electrical dipole moment in quantum mechanics
  - Molecular dipole moment, the electric dipole moment of a molecule
  - Bond dipole moment, the measure of polarity of a chemical bond
  - Electron electric dipole moment, the measure of the charge distribution within an electron
- Magnetic dipole moment, the measure of the magnetic polarity of a system of charges
  - Electron magnetic moment
  - Nuclear magnetic moment, the magnetic moment of an atomic nucleus
- Topological dipole moment, the measure of the topological defect charge distribution
- The first order term (or the second term) of the multipole expansion of a function
- The dielectric constant of a solvent; the measure of its capacity to break the covalent molecules into ions

== See also ==
- Dipole (disambiguation)
- Moment (disambiguation)
