= Route reestablishment notification =

Route Reestablishment Notification (RRN) is a type of notification that is used in some communications protocols that use time-division multiplexing.
