= Residual bit error rate =

Quality metric in digital transmission

The residual bit error rate (RBER) is a receive quality metric in digital transmission, one of several used to quantify the accuracy of the received data.

== Overview ==
In digital transmission schemes, including cellular telephony systems such as GSM, a certain percentage of received data will be detected as containing errors, and will be discarded. The likelihood that a particular bit will be detected as erroneous is the bit error rate.

The RBER characterizes the likelihood that a given bit will be erroneous but will not be detected as such

== Applications ==
When digital communication systems are being designed, the maximum acceptable residual bit error rate can be used, along with other quality metrics, to calculate the minimum acceptable signal-to-noise ratio in the system. This in turn provides minimum requirements for the physical and electronic design of the transmitter and receiver.
