= Digital transmission hierarchy =

Digital transmission hierarchy may refer to:

- Plesiochronous Digital Hierarchy (PDH)
- Synchronous Digital Hierarchy

== See also ==
- Digital multiplex hierarchy
