= Digital multiplex hierarchy =

In telecommunications, a digital multiplex hierarchy is a hierarchy consisting of an ordered repetition of tandem digital multiplexers that produce signals of successively higher data rates at each level of the hierarchy.

Digital multiplexing hierarchies may be implemented in many different configurations depending on; (a) the number of channels desired, (b) the signaling system to be used, and (c) the bit rate allowed by the communications media.

Some currently available digital multiplexers have been designated as Dl-, DS-, or M-series, all of which operate at T-carrier rates.

In the design of digital multiplex hierarchies, care must be exercised to ensure interoperability of the multiplexers used in the hierarchy.

== Digroup ==
Digroup is an abbreviation for digital group. In telephony, a basic group in the digital multiplex hierarchy.

In the North American and Japanese T-carrier digital hierarchies, each digroup supports 12 PCM voice channels or their equivalent in other services. The DS1 line rate (2 digroups plus overhead bits) is 1.544 Mbit/s, supporting 24 voice channels or their equivalent in other services.

In the E-carrier European hierarchy, each digroup supports 15 PCM channels or their equivalent in other services. The DS1 line rate (2 digroups plus overhead bits) is 2.048 Mbit/s, supporting 30 voice channels or their equivalent in other services.

== See also ==
- Digital transmission hierarchy
- Plesiochronous digital hierarchy
- Synchronous digital hierarchy
- Transmission (telecommunications)
