= Bipolar signal =

Type of telecommunications signal with two non-zero polarities

In telecommunications, a bipolar signal is a signal which may assume either of two polarities, neither of which is zero.

A bipolar signal may have a two-state non-return-to-zero (NRZ) or a three-state return-to-zero (RZ) binary coding scheme.

A bipolar signal is usually symmetrical regarding zero amplitude, i.e., the absolute values of the positive and negative signal states are nominally equal. Contrast with unipolar encoding where one state is zero amplitude.
