= Hybrid ternary code =

Type of ternary line code in telecommunications

In telecommunications, the hybrid (H-) ternary line code is a line code that operates on a hybrid principle combining the binary non-return-to-zero-level (NRZL) and the polar return-to-zero (RZ) codes.

The H-ternary code has three levels for signal representation; these are positive (+), zero (0), and negative (−). These three levels are represented by three states. The state of the line code could be in any one of these three states. A transition takes place to the next state as a result of a binary input 1 or 0 and the encoder's present output state. The encoding procedure is as follows.

Input bit	Prior output	Output level
0	+	−
0	0	−
0	−	0
1	+	0
1	0	+
1	−	+

1. In general, the encoder outputs + level for a binary 1 input and a − level for a binary 0 input.
2. However, if this would result in the same output level as the previous bit time, a 0 level is output instead.
3. Initially, the encoder output present state is assumed at 0 level when the first bit arrives at the encoder input.

The new line-coding scheme violates the encoding rule of NRZ-L when a sequence of 1s or 0s arrives and hence, it overcomes some of their deficiencies. During the violation period for a run of 1s or 0s, it operates on the same encoding rule of the polar RZ but with pulse occupancy of full period.

NRZ-L and polar RZ codes have deficiencies compared to the proposed H-ternary encoding scheme. NRZ-L code lacks sufficient timing information when the binary signal remains at one level in of either 1 or 0. This has direct influence on synchronising the receiver clock with that of the transmitter and, as a result, has impact on the detection of the received digital signal.

The H-ternary code has also timing superiority compared to similar ternary codes. Other ternary line code such as alternate mark inversion (AMI) also lacks the timing information when a run of zeros needs to be transmitted. This drawback is partly overcome by its modified version the high density bipolar with three zeros substitution (HDB3).

On the other hand, the new code has a smaller bandwidth in comparison with the polar RZ code. The latter has its frequency spectral components concentrated at twice the original binary data rate because the polar RZ code has a pulse duty cycle of 50 percent.

== See also ==
Other line codes that have three states:

- Bipolar encoding
- MLT-3 encoding
- Manchester encoding
- B3ZS
- 4B3T
