= HMPS =

HMPS may be:

- His Majesty's Prison Service, of the United Kingdom
- Hansraj Morarji Public School, in Andheri, Mumbai, India
- His/Her Majesty's Pakistani Ship, of the 1947-1957 Royal Pakistan Navy, a variant of the His Majesty's Ship ship prefix; see 1947 Royal Indian Navy

== See also ==
- HMP (disambiguation)
