= Pseudo bit error ratio =

Bit error ratio

Pseudo bit error ratio (PBER) in adaptive high-frequency (HF) radio, is a bit error ratio derived by majority logic decoding to processes redundant transmissions.

Note: In adaptive HF radio automatic link establishment, PBER is determined by the extent of error correction, such as by using the fraction of non-unanimous votes in the 2-of-3 majority decoder.

This article incorporates public domain material from Federal Standard 1037C. General Services Administration. Archived from the original on 2022-01-22. (in support of MIL-STD-188).
