= G.703 =

ITU-T recommendation

- Pulse code modulation (PCM) of voice frequencies
- Status: In force
- Year started: 1988
- Latest version: (04/16); April 2016
- Organization: ITU-T
- Related standards: G.191, G.711, G.729
- Domain: audio compression
- Website: https://www.itu.int/rec/T-REC-G.703

G.703 is a ITU-T standard originally written in 1972 but subsequently revised a number of times since. It defines a physical and electrical interface used for encoding voice or data over 75 ohm co-axial cable terminated in BNC or Type 43 connectors or 120 ohm twisted pair cables terminated in RJ48C jacks. The choice is carrier- and region-dependent.

G.703 defines digital carriers of various speeds such as T1 and E1. These are organised as part of a hierarchy of carriers defined in G.702.

A G.703 E1 link is typically, though not necessarily, framed using the G.704 standard which divides the data stream into time slots. Typically, each time slots represents an E0 (64 kbit/s) voice channel encoded using pulse-code modulation (PCM). The PCM coding is defined in the G.711 standard. G.704 also includes a control timeslot slot and a signalling timeslot (CAS or CCS).
