= DS0A =

DS0A is the interface most commonly used for SS7 networks in the US. It is a 56/64 kbit/s channel typically located in a DS1 or larger facility. The DS0A electrical interface usually only exists inside a central office environment, and only exists for the sole purpose of connecting into a channel bank to be multiplexed onto a higher facility.

== Sources ==
- Cisco SS7 Fundamentals (archived website, saved 13th of March 2013)
- Russell, Travis. "Signaling System # 7", Mcgraw-Hill Telecommunications. ISBN 9780071822145
