= Viterbi error rate =

Digital transmission error measurement

In digital transmission, the Viterbi error rate, also known as the Viterbi bit error rate (VBER), is a measurement of error in the transmission of digital Information after the original signal has been corrected for errors and aberrations, usually noise and/or distortion. The value of the VBER is directly linked to the quality of the Channel Bit Error Rate (CBER), a measurement of the strength & quality of the original signal.

== Example ==
Here is an example of transmitted digital code.

1 0 1 0 1

The following, distorted signal is received.

1 1 0 1 0

The VBER is determined by dividing the number of incorrectly received digits, or bits, (in this case 4), by the total number of bits received.

So, in this case, the VBER is equal to 4/5 which equals 0.8, or 80%. That is, 80% of the bits were incorrectly received. Except for extreme cases of interference, a signal can be completely corrected (using an error correction code technique) and thus achieve a VBER of 0. That is, a signal with 0 post correction errors can be achieved.

== See also ==
- Bit error rate
- Channel bit error rate
