= Host Monitoring Protocol =

Obsolete TCP/IP protocol

Host Monitoring Protocol (HMP) is an obsolete TCP/IP protocol described in RFC 869.
