= Central office =

Central office can mean any of the following:

- Telephone exchange
  - Class-5 telephone switch
- Headquarters
  - Corporate headquarters
  - Conservative Campaign Headquarters (Britain), formerly Conservative Central Office
