= 4B3T =

4B3T, which stands for 4 (four) binary 3 (three) ternary, is a line encoding scheme used for ISDN PRI interface. 4B3T represents four binary bits using three pulses. It uses three output levels (+, 0, and −) and a paired disparity code to maintain a zero DC bias over time.

== Description ==
It uses three output levels:

- + (positive pulse),
- 0 (no pulse), and
- − (negative pulse).

This means we have 2^{4} = 16 input combinations to represent, using 3^{3} = 27 output combinations. 000 is not used to avoid long periods without a transition. 4B3T uses a paired disparity code to achieve an overall zero DC bias: six triplets are used which have no DC component (0+−, 0−+, +0−, −0+, +−0, −+0), and the remaining 20 are grouped into 10 pairs with differing disparity (e.g. ++− and −−+). When transmitting, the DC bias is tracked and a combination chosen that has a DC component of the opposite sign to the running total.

This mapping from 4 bits to three ternary states is given in a table known as Modified Monitoring State 43 (MMS43). A competing encoding technique, used for the ISDN basic rate interface where 4B3T is not used, is 2B1Q.

The sync sequence used is the 11-symbol Barker code, +++−−−+−−+− or its reverse, −+−−+−−−+++.

== Encoding table ==
Each 4-bit input group is encoded as a 3-symbol group (transmitted left to right) from the following table. Encoding requires keeping track of the accumulated DC offset, the number of + pulses minus the number of − pulses in all preceding groups. The starting value is arbitrary; here we use the values 1 through 4, although −1.5, −0.5, +0.5 and +1.5 is another possibility.

MMS 43 coding table
Input		Accumulated DC offset			
Hex	Binary	1	2	3	4
0	0000	+ 0 + (+2)	0−0 (−1)		
1	0001	0 − + (+0)			
2	0010	+ − 0 (+0)			
3	0011	0 0 + (+1)			− − 0 (−2)
4	0100	− + 0 (+0)			
5	0101	0 + + (+2)	− 0 0 (−1)		
6	0110	− + + (+1)		− − + (−1)	
7	0111	− 0 + (+0)			
8	1000	+ 0 0 (+1)			0 − − (−2)
9	1001	+ − + (+1)			− − − (−3)
A	1010	+ + − (+1)		+ − − (−1)	
B	1011	+ 0 − (+0)			
C	1100	+ + + (+3)	− + − (−1)		
D	1101	0 + 0 (+1)			− 0 − (−2)
E	1110	0 + − (+0)			
F	1111	+ + 0 (+2)	0 0 − (−1)		

This code forces a transition after at most five consecutive identical non-zero symbols, or four consecutive zero symbols.

== Decoding table ==
Decoding is simpler, as the decoder does not need to keep track of the encoder state, although doing so allows greater error detection. The 000 triplet is not a legal encoded sequence, but is typically decoded as binary 0000.

Ternary	Binary	Hex	Ternary	Binary	Hex	Ternary	Binary	Hex
0 0 0	—N/a		− 0 0	0101	5	+ − −	1010	A
+ 0 +	0000	0	− + +	0110	6	+ 0 −	1011	B
0 − 0	0000	0	− − +	0110	6	+ + +	1100	C
0 − +	0001	1	− 0 +	0111	7	− + −	1100	C
+ − 0	0010	2	+ 0 0	1000	8	0 + 0	1101	D
0 0 +	0011	3	0 − −	1000	8	− 0 −	1101	D
− − 0	0011	3	+ − +	1001	9	0 + −	1110	E
− + 0	0100	4	− − −	1001	9	+ + 0	1111	F
0 + +	0101	5	+ + −	1010	A	0 0 −	1111	F

== 8B/6T ==
A similar paired-disparity code was used in the short-lived 100BASE-T4 Fast Ethernet standard. This achieved the same ratio of 4/3 bits per baud while needing to keep track of only two levels of accumulated DC offset by using a larger 256-entry coding table. 6 ternary symbols allow 140 balanced codes (30 permutations of +0000−, 90 permutations of ++00−−, and 20 permutations of +++−−−), and 126 codes with disparity +1 (6 permutations of +00000, 60 permutations of ++000−, and 60 permutations of +++0−−). The codes with disparity +1 are inverted whenever the running disparity is high. From the total of 266 code words, 256 are used as follows:

8B/6T coding table
8B	6T	8B	6T	8B	6T	8B	6T	8B	6T	8B	6T	8B	6T	8B	6T
00	+−00+−	20	00−++−	40	+0+00−	60	0−0++0	80	+−+00−	A0	0−0++−	C0	+−+0+−	E0	+−0++−
01	0+−+−0	21	−−+00+	41	++00−0	61	00−+0+	81	++−0−0	A1	00−+−+	C1	++−+−0	E1	0+−+−+
02	+−0+−0	22	++−0+−	42	+0+0−0	62	0−0+0+	82	+−+0−0	A2	0−0+−+	C2	+−++−0	E2	+−0+−+
03	−0++−0	23	++−0−+	43	0++0−0	63	−00+0+	83	−++0−0	A3	−00+−+	C3	−+++−0	E3	−0++−+
04	−0+0+−	24	00+0−+	44	0++00−	64	−00++0	84	−++00−	A4	−00++−	C4	−++0+−	E4	−0+++−
05	0+−−0+	25	00+0+−	45	++0−00	65	00−0++	85	++−−00	A5	00−−++	C5	++−−0+	E5	0+−−++
06	+−0−0+	26	00−00+	46	+0+−00	66	0−00++	86	+−+−00	A6	0−0−++	C6	+−+−0+	E6	+−0−++
07	−0+−0+	27	−−+++−	47	0++−00	67	−000++	87	−++−00	A7	−00−++	C7	−++−0+	E7	−0+−++
08	−+00+−	28	−0−++0	48	000+00	68	−+−++0	88	0+000−	A8	−+−++−	C8	0+00+−	E8	−+0++−
09	0−++−0	29	−−0+0+	49	000−++	69	−−++0+	89	00+0−0	A9	−−++−+	C9	00++−0	E9	0−++−+
0A	−+0+−0	2A	−0−+0+	4A	000+−+	6A	−+−+0+	8A	0+00−0	AA	−+−+−+	CA	0+0+−0	EA	−+0+−+
0B	+0−+−0	2B	0−−+0+	4B	000++−	6B	+−−+0+	8B	+000−0	AB	+−−+−+	CB	+00+−0	EB	+0−+−+
0C	+0−0+−	2C	0−−++0	4C	000−+0	6C	+−−++0	8C	+0000−	AC	+−−++−	CC	+000+−	EC	+0−++−
0D	0−+−0+	2D	−−00++	4D	000−0+	6D	−−+0++	8D	00+−00	AD	−−+−++	CD	00+−0+	ED	0−+−++
0E	−+0−0+	2E	−0−0++	4E	000+−0	6E	−+−0++	8E	0+0−00	AE	−+−−++	CE	0+0−0+	EE	−+0−++
0F	+0−−0+	2F	0−−0++	4F	000+0−	6F	+−−0++	8F	+00−00	AF	+−−−++	CF	+00−0+	EF	+0−−++
10	+0+−−0	30	+−00−+	50	+0+−−+	70	−++000	90	+−+−−+	B0	0−000+	D0	+−+0−+	F0	+−000+
11	++0−0−	31	0+−−+0	51	++0−+−	71	+−+000	91	++−−+−	B1	00−0+0	D1	++−−+0	F1	0+−0+0
12	+0+−0−	32	+−0−+0	52	+0+−+−	72	++−000	92	+−+−+−	B2	0−00+0	D2	+−+−+0	F2	+−00+0
13	0++−0−	33	−0+−+0	53	0++−+−	73	00+000	93	−++−+−	B3	−000+0	D3	−++−+0	F3	−0+0+0
14	0++−−0	34	−0+0−+	54	0++−−+	74	−0+000	94	−++−−+	B4	−0000+	D4	−++0−+	F4	−0+00+
15	++00−−	35	0+−+0−	55	++0+−−	75	0−+000	95	++−+−−	B5	00−+00	D5	++−+0−	F5	0+−+00
16	+0+0−−	36	+−0+0−	56	+0++−−	76	+0−000	96	+−++−−	B6	0−0+00	D6	+−++0−	F6	+−0+00
17	0++0−−	37	−0++0−	57	0+++−−	77	0+−000	97	−+++−−	B7	−00+00	D7	−+++0−	F7	−0++00
18	0+−0+−	38	−+00−+	58	+++0−−	78	0−−+++	98	0+0−−+	B8	−+−00+	D8	0+00−+	F8	−+000+
19	0+−0−+	39	0−+−+0	59	+++−0−	79	−0−+++	99	00+−+−	B9	−−+0+0	D9	00+−+0	F9	0−+0+0
1A	0+−++−	3A	−+0−+0	5A	+++−−0	7A	−−0+++	9A	0+0−+−	BA	−+−0+0	DA	0+0−+0	FA	−+00+0
1B	0+−00+	3B	+0−−+0	5B	++0−−0	7B	−−0++0	9B	+00−+−	BB	+−−0+0	DB	+00−+0	FB	+0−0+0
1C	0−+00+	3C	+0−0−+	5C	++0−−+	7C	++−00−	9C	+00−−+	BC	+−−00+	DC	+000−+	FC	+0−00+
1D	0−+++−	3D	0−++0−	5D	++000−	7D	00+00−	9D	00++−−	BD	−−++00	DD	00++0−	FD	0−++00
1E	0−+0−+	3E	−+0+0−	5E	−−+++0	7E	++−−−+	9E	0+0+−−	BE	−+−+00	DE	0+0+0−	FE	−+0+00
1F	0−+0+−	3F	+0−+0−	5F	00−++0	7F	00+−−+	9F	+00+−−	BF	+−−+00	DF	+00+0−	FF	+0−+00
Unused						—N/a	+++−−−	—N/a	+−0000	—N/a	−+0000	—N/a	+00000	—N/a	0+0000
Unused						—N/a	−−−+++	—N/a	0000−+	—N/a	0000+−	—N/a	00000+	—N/a	0000+0

== See also ==
- Hybrid ternary code
- Bipolar encoding
- MLT-3 encoding
- B3ZS
