= Digital Signal 0 =

Digital Signal 0 (DS0) is a basic digital signaling rate of 64 kilobits per second (kbit/s), corresponding to the capacity of one analog voice-frequency-equivalent communication channel. The DS0 rate, and its equivalents E0 in the E-carrier system and T0 in the T-carrier system, form the basis for the digital multiplex transmission hierarchy in telecommunications systems used in North America, Europe, Japan, and the rest of the world, for both the early plesiochronous systems such as T-carrier and for modern synchronous systems such as SDH/SONET.

The DS0 rate was introduced to carry a single digitized voice call. For a typical phone call, the audio sound is digitized at an 8 kHz sample rate, or 8000 samples per second, using 8-bit pulse-code modulation for each of the samples. This results in a data rate of 64 kbit/s.

Because of its fundamental role in carrying a single phone call, the DS0 rate forms the basis for the digital multiplex transmission hierarchy in telecommunications systems used in North America. To limit the number of wires required between two involved in exchanging voice calls, a system was built in which multiple DS0s are multiplexed together on higher capacity circuits. In this system, twenty-four (24) DS0s are multiplexed into a DS1 signal. Twenty-eight (28) DS1s are multiplexed into a DS3. When carried over copper wire, this is the well-known T-carrier system, with T1 and T3 corresponding to DS1 and DS3, respectively.

Besides its use for voice communications, the DS0 rate may support twenty 2.4 kbit/s channels, ten 4.8 kbit/s channels, five 9.67 kbit/s channels, one 56 kbit/s channel, or one 64 kbit/s clear channel.

E0 (standardized as ITU G.703) is the European equivalent of the North American DS0 for carrying a single voice call. However, there are some subtle differences in implementation. Voice signals are encoded for carriage over E0 according to ITU G.711. Note that when a T-carrier system is used as in North America, robbed-bit signaling can mean that a DS0 channel carried over that system is not an error-free bit-stream. The out-of-band signaling used in the European E-carrier system avoids this.

== See also ==
- DS0A
- Digital Signal 1
- Digital Signal 3
