= Dipole (disambiguation) =

In physics, a dipole is a quantity involving some form of polarity.

Dipole may also refer to:

== In physics ==
- Electric dipole
- Magnetic dipole
- Dipole moment (disambiguation)
- A flow dipole, a separation of a sink and a source in potential flow

== In meteorology ==
- Arctic dipole anomaly
- Indian Ocean Dipole
- Subtropical Indian Ocean Dipole

== Other uses ==
- Dipole antenna, a type of radio antenna
- Dipole magnet, a permanent magnet
- Dipole graph, a graph with two poles
- Dipole speaker, a loudspeaker enclosure
- Dipole model of the Earth's magnetic field, a first order approximation of the rather complex true Earth's magnetic field (which can be viewed as dipolar)
- Dipole anisotropy, the progressive difference in the frequency of radiation from opposite directions due to the motion of the observer relative to the source
- Dipole–dipole attraction, one of several intermolecular forces

== See also ==
- Monopole (disambiguation)
- Quadrupole
- Multipole expansion
- Bipolar (disambiguation)
