= Channel-associated signaling =

Channel-associated signaling (CAS), also known as per-trunk signaling (PTS), is a form of digital communication signaling. As with most telecommunication signaling methods, it uses routing information to direct the payload of voice or data to its destination. With CAS, this routing information is encoded and transmitted in the same channel as the payload itself. This information can be transmitted in the same band (in-band signaling) or a separate band (out-of-band signaling) to the payload. Call setup will be comparatively slower since signaling channels are shared thus congestion can be faced.

CAS potentially results in lower available bandwidth for the payload. For example, in the PSTN the use of out-of-band signaling within a fixed bandwidth reduces a 64 kbit/s DS0 to 56 kbit/s. Because of this, and the inherent security benefits of separating the control lines from the payload, telephone systems introduced since the 1960s rely more on common-channel signaling (CCS).

The most common implementation of CAS is robbed-bit signaling.
