= T-carrier =

Carrier system for digital transmission of multiplexed telephone calls

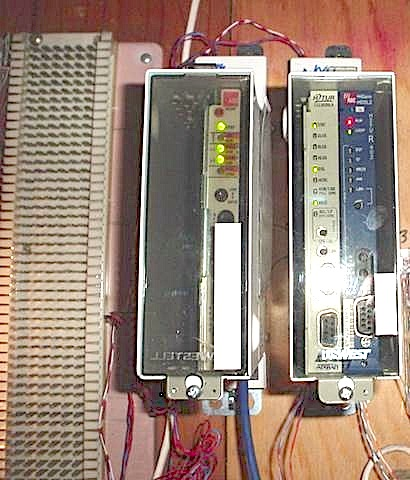
Left: A 66 block; center and right: Cabinets containing Smartjack network interface devices for T1 circuits

The T-carrier system is a member of the series of data-multiplexing carrier systems developed by AT&T Bell Laboratories for digital transmission of multiplexed telephone calls.

The first version, the Transmission System 1 (T1), was introduced in 1962 in the Bell System, and could transmit up to 24 telephone calls simultaneously over a single transmission line of twisted pair copper wire. Subsequent specifications carried multiples of the basic T1 (1.544 Mbit/s) data rates, such as T2 (6.312 Mbit/s) with 96 channels, T3 (44.736 Mbit/s) with 672 channels, and others.

Although a T2 was defined as part of AT&T's T-carrier system, which defined five levels, T1 through T5, only the T1 and T3 were commonly in use. (Note: 1999 ad: On the left, in an aisle seat, a man who very much "filled" his airline seat while on the right side of the aisle is a height-challenged man whose shoe toes barely reach the floor)

== Transmission System 1 ==
The T-carrier is a hardware specification for carrying multiple time-division multiplexed (TDM) telecommunications channels over a single four-wire transmission circuit. It was developed by AT&T at Bell Laboratories ca. 1957 and first employed by 1962 for long-haul pulse-code modulation (PCM) digital voice transmission with the D1 channel bank.

The T-carriers are commonly used for trunking between switching centers in a telephone network, including to private branch exchange (PBX) interconnect points. It uses the same twisted pair copper wire that analog trunks used, employing one pair for transmitting, and another pair for receiving. Signal repeaters may be used for extended distance requirements.

Before the digital T-carrier system, carrier wave systems such as 12-channel carrier systems worked by frequency-division multiplexing; each call was an analog signal. A T1 trunk could transmit 24 telephone calls at a time, because it used a digital carrier signal called Digital Signal 1 (DS-1). DS-1 is a communications protocol for multiplexing the bitstreams of up to 24 telephone calls, along with one special bit: a framing bit (for frame synchronization). T1's maximum data transmission rate is 1.544 megabits per second. (24 Channels × 8 bits) + 1 framing bit @ 8000 samples per second = 1,544,000 bit/s.

Outside of the United States, Canada, Japan, and South Korea, the E-carrier system is used. E-carrier is similar transmission system with higher capacity that is not directly compatible with the T-carrier.

== Legacy ==
Existing frequency-division multiplexing carrier systems worked well for connections between distant cities, but required expensive modulators, demodulators and filters for every voice channel. In the late 1950s, Bell Labs sought cheaper terminal equipment for connections within metropolitan areas. Pulse-code modulation allowed sharing a coder and decoder among several voice trunks, so this method was chosen for the T1 system introduced into local use in 1961. In later decades, the cost of digital electronics declined to the point that an individual codec per voice channel became commonplace, but by then the other advantages of digital transmission had become entrenched.

The T1 format carried 24 pulse-code modulated, time-division multiplexed speech signals each encoded in 64 kbit/s streams, leaving 8 kbit/s of framing information which facilitates the synchronization and demultiplexing at the receiver. The T2 and T3 circuit channels carry multiple T1 channels multiplexed, resulting in transmission rates of 6.312 and 44.736 Mbit/s, respectively. A T3 line comprises 28 T1 lines, each operating at total signaling rate of 1.544 Mbit/s. It is possible to get a fractional T3 line, meaning a T3 line with some of the 28 lines turned off, resulting in a slower transfer rate but typically at reduced cost.

Supposedly, the 1.544 Mbit/s rate was chosen because tests by AT&T Long Lines in Chicago were conducted underground. The test site was typical of Bell System outside plant of the time in that, to accommodate loading coils, cable vault manholes were physically 2,000 meters (6,600 feet) apart, which determined the repeater spacing. The optimum bit rate was chosen empirically—the capacity was increased until the failure rate was unacceptable, then reduced to leave a margin. Companding allowed acceptable audio performance with only seven bits per PCM sample in this original T1/D1 system. The later D3 and D4 channel banks had an extended frame format, allowing eight bits per sample, reduced to seven every sixth sample or frame when one bit was "robbed" for signaling the state of the channel. The standard does not allow an all zero sample which would produce a long string of binary zeros and cause the repeaters to lose bit sync (on D4/AMI and earlier systems). However, when carrying data (Switched 56) there could be long strings of zeros, so one bit per sample is set to "1" (jam bit 7) leaving 7 bits × 8,000 frames per second for data. On Extended Superframe B8ZS systems, long strings of zeros are replaced by a special code. This allows equipment to maintain sync, while also allowing 64kbps of data to be carried by each time slot.

A more detailed understanding of the development of the 1.544 Mbit/s rate and its division into channels is as follows. Given that the telephone system nominal voiceband (including guardband) is 4,000 Hz, the required digital sampling rate is 8,000 Hz (see Nyquist rate). Since each T1 frame contains 1 byte of voice data for each of the 24 channels, that system needs then 8,000 frames per second to maintain those 24 simultaneous voice channels. Because each frame of a T1 is 193 bits in length (24 channels × 8 bits per channel + 1 framing bit = 193 bits), 8,000 frames per second is multiplied by 193 bits to yield a transfer rate of 1.544 Mbit/s (8,000 × 193 = 1,544,000).

Initially, T1 used Alternate Mark Inversion (AMI) to reduce frequency bandwidth and eliminate the DC component of the signal. Later B8ZS became common practice. For AMI, each mark pulse had the opposite polarity of the previous one and each space was at a level of zero, resulting in a three level signal which carried only binary data. Similar 1970s British 23 channel systems at 1.536 megabaud were equipped with ternary signal repeaters, in anticipation of using a 3B2T or 4B3T code to increase the number of voice channels in the future. But in the 1980s, the systems were merely replaced with European standard ones. American T-carriers could only work in AMI or B8ZS mode.

The AMI or B8ZS signal allowed a simple error rate measurement. The D bank in the central office could detect a bit with the wrong polarity, or "bipolarity violation" and sound an alarm. Later systems could count the number of violations and reframes and otherwise measure signal quality and allow a more sophisticated alarm indication signal system.

The decision to use a 193-bit frame was made in 1958. To allow for the identification of information bits within a frame, two alternatives were considered. Assign (a) just one extra bit, or (b) additional eight bits per frame. The 8-bit choice is cleaner, resulting in a 200-bit frame, twenty-five 8-bit channels, of which 24 are traffic and one 8-bit channel available for operations, administration, and maintenance (OA&M). AT&T chose the single bit per frame not to reduce the required bit rate (1.544 vs 1.6 Mbit/s), but because AT&T Marketing worried that "if 8 bits were chosen for OA&M function, someone would then try to sell this as a voice channel and you wind up with nothing."

Soon after commercial success of T1 in 1962, the T1 engineering team realized the mistake of having only one bit to serve the increasing demand for housekeeping functions. They petitioned AT&T management to change to 8-bit framing. This was flatly turned down because it would make installed systems obsolete.

Having this hindsight, some ten years later, CEPT chose eight bits for framing the European E1, although, as feared, the extra channel is sometimes appropriated for voice or data.

== Higher bandwidth carriers ==
In the 1970s, Bell Labs developed higher rate systems. T1C with a more sophisticated modulation scheme carried 3 Mbit/s, on those balanced pair cables that could support it. T-2 carried 6.312 Mbit/s, requiring a special low-capacitance cable with foam insulation. This was standard for Picturephone. T-4 and T-5 used coaxial cables, similar to the old L-carriers used by AT&T Long Lines. TD microwave radio relay systems were also fitted with high rate modems to allow them to carry a DS1 signal in a portion of their FM spectrum that had too poor quality for voice service. Later they carried DS3 and DS4 signals. During the 1980s companies such as RLH Industries, Inc. developed T1 over optical fiber. The industry soon developed and evolved with multiplexed T1 transmission schemes.

T Classification	Maximum Speed
T1	1.544 Mbit/s
T2	6.312 Mbit/s
T3	44.736 Mbit/s
T4	274.176 Mbit/s
T5	568.64 Mbit/s

== Digital signal cross-connect ==
DS1 signals are interconnected typically at central office locations at a common metallic cross-connect point known as a DSX-1. When a DS1 is transported over metallic outside plant cable, the signal travels over conditioned cable pairs known as a T1 span. A T1 span can have up to +-130 Volts of DC power superimposed on the associated four wire cable pairs to supply power to line or "span" signal repeaters, and T1 NIU's (T1 Smartjacks). T1 span repeaters are typically engineered up to 6,000 feet (1,800 m) apart, depending on cable gauge, and at no more than 36 dB of loss before requiring a repeated span. There can be no cable bridge taps or Load Coils across any pairs.

T1 copper spans are being replaced by optical transport systems, but if a copper (or otherwise metallic) span is used, the T1 is typically carried over an HDSL encoded copper line. Four wire HDSL does not require as many repeaters as conventional T1 spans. Newer two wire HDSL (HDSL-2) equipment transports a full 1.544 Mbit/s T1 over a single copper wire pair up to approximately 12,000 feet (3.7 km), if all 24 gauge cable is used. HDSL-2 does not employ multiple repeaters as does conventional four wire HDSL, or newer HDSL-4 systems.

One advantage of HDSL is its ability to operate with a limited number of bridge taps, with no tap being closer than 500 feet (150 m) from any HDSL transceiver. Both two or four wire HDSL equipment transmits and receives over the same cable wire pair, as compared to conventional T1 service that utilizes individual cable pairs for transmit or receive.

DS3 signals are rare except within buildings, where they are used for interconnections and as an intermediate step before being multiplexed onto a SONET circuit. This is because a T3 circuit can only go about 600 feet (180 m) between repeaters. A customer who orders a DS3 usually receives a SONET circuit run into the building and a multiplexer mounted in a utility box. The DS3 is delivered in its familiar form, two coax cables (1 for send and 1 for receive) with BNC connectors on the ends.

== Bit robbing ==
Twelve DS1 frames make up a single T1 superframe (T1 SF). Each T1 superframe is composed of two signaling frames. All T1 DS0 channels that employ in-band signaling will have its eighth bit over written, or "robbed" from the full 64 kbit/s DS0 payload, by either a logical ZERO or ONE bit to signify a circuit signaling state or condition. Hence robbed bit signaling will restrict a DS0 channel to a rate of only 56 kbit/s during two of the twelve DS1 frames that make up a T1 SF framed circuit. T1 SF framed circuits yield two independent signaling channels (A and B) T1 ESF framed circuits four signaling frames in a twenty four frame extended frame format that yield four independent signaling channels (A, B, C, and D).

Fifty-six kbit/s DS0 channels are associated with digital data service (DDS) services typically do not utilize the eighth bit of the DS0 as voice circuits that employ A&B out-of-band signaling. One exception is Switched 56 kbit/s DDS. In DDS, bit eight is used to identify DTE request to send (RTS) condition. With Switched 56 DDS, bit eight is pulsed (alternately set to logical ZERO and ONE) to transmit two state dial pulse signaling information between a SW56 DDS CSU/DSU, and a digital end office switch.

The use of robbed-bit signaling in America has decreased significantly as a result of Signaling System No 7 (SS7) on inter-office dial trunks. With SS7, the full 64 kbit/s DS0 channel is available for use on a connection, and allows 64 kbit/s, and 128 kbit/s ISDN data calls to exist over a switched trunk network connection if the supporting T1 carrier entity is optioned B8ZS (Clear Channel Capable).

For legacy voice services, bit robbing is used for signaling when a phone/trunk line is off hook, or when a phone should be rung. This could be for FXS/FXO/PLAR interfaces or 4W E&M. For ESF systems idle = 0101, off hook = 1111, ring = 0000. For private line automatic ringdowns (ARDs), 1111 = idle, 0000 = off hook. Some say that ARDs should be all 0s idle, all 1s off hook, but this doesn't seem to be the standard at least for ESF. The advantage with the latter is that if the T1 goes down, it will be interpreted as all 1s by the equipment, causing the phones on both ends to start ringing, alerting both parties of a failure once they pick up and don't hear anyone.

== Carrier pricing ==
Carriers price DS1 lines in many different ways. However, most boil down to two simple components: local loop (the cost the local incumbent charges to transport the signal from the end user's central office, otherwise known as a CO, to the point of presence, otherwise known as a POP, of the carrier) and the port (the cost to access the telephone network or the Internet through the carrier's network). Typically, the port price is based upon access speed and yearly commitment level while the loop is based on geography. The farther the CO and POP, the more the loop costs.

The loop price has several components built into it, including the mileage calculation (performed in V/H coordinates, not standard GPS coordinates) and the telco piece. Each local Bell operating company—namely Verizon, AT&T Inc., and Qwest—charge T-carriers different price per mile rates. Therefore, the price calculation has two distance steps: geomapping and the determination of local price arrangements.

While most carriers utilize a geographic pricing model as described above, some Competitive Local Exchange Carriers (CLECs), such as TelePacific, Integra Telecom, tw telecom, Windstream, Level 3 Communications, and XO Communications offer national pricing.

Under this DS1 pricing model, a provider charges the same price in every geography it services. National pricing is an outgrowth of increased competition in the T-carrier market space and the commoditization of T-carrier products. Providers that have adopted a national pricing strategy may experience widely varying margins as their suppliers, the Bell operating companies (e.g., Verizon, AT&T Inc., and Qwest), maintain geographic pricing models, albeit at wholesale prices.

For voice DS1 lines, the calculation is mostly the same, except that the port (required for Internet access) is replaced by LDU (otherwise known as Long Distance Usage). Once the price of the loop is determined, only voice-related charges are added to the total. In short, the total price = loop + LDU × minutes used.

== See also ==
- Communications in Japan
- Comparison of T-carrier and E-carrier systems
- List of interface bit rates
- Modified AMI code
- Optical Carrier transmission rates
- Plesiochronous digital hierarchy
- STM-1
- Telecommunications in South Korea
