= Digital Signal 1 =

T-carrier signal by Bell Labs

Digital Signal 1 (DS1, sometimes DS-1) is a T-carrier signaling scheme devised by Bell Labs. DS1 is the primary digital telephone standard used in the United States, Canada and Japan and is able to transmit up to 24 multiplexed voice and data calls over telephone lines. E-carrier is used in place of T-carrier outside the United States, Canada, Japan, and South Korea. DS1 is the logical bit pattern used over a physical T1 line; in practice, the terms DS1 and T1 are often used interchangeably. (Note: The "DS" refers to the rate and format of the signal, while the "T" designation refers to the equipment providing the signals. In practice, "DS" and "T" are used synonymously; hence DS1 is T1 and vice versa.)

== Overview ==
T1 refers to the primary digital telephone carrier system used in North America. T1 is one line type of the PCM T-carrier hierarchy. T1 describes the cabling, signal type, and signal regeneration requirements of the carrier system.

PCM T-Carrier Hierarchy
Digital Signal Designation	Line rate	Channels (DS0s)	Line
DS0	64 kbit/s	1	
DS1	1.544 Mbit/s	24	T1
DS1C	3.152 Mbit/s	48	T1C
DS2	6.312 Mbit/s	96	T2
DS3	44.736 Mbit/s	672	T3
DS4	274.176 Mbit/s	4032	T4
DS5	400.352 Mbit/s	5760	T5

The signal transmitted on a T1 line, referred to as the DS1 signal, consists of serial bits transmitted at the rate of 1.544 Mbit/s. The type of line code used is called Alternate Mark Inversion (AMI). Digital Signal Designation is the classification of digital bit rates in the digital multiplex hierarchy used in transport of telephone signals from one location to another. DS-1 is a communications protocol for multiplexing the bitstreams of up to 24 telephone calls, along with two special bits: a framing bit (for frame synchronization) and a maintenance-signaling bit, transmitted over a digital circuit called T1. T1's maximum data transmission rate is 1.544 megabits per second.

== Bandwidth ==
A DS1 telecommunication circuit multiplexes 24 DS0s. The twenty-four DS0s sampled 8,000 times per second (one 8bit PCM sample from each DSO per DS1 frame) consume 1.536 Mbit/s of bandwidth. One framing bit adds 8 kbit/s of overhead, for a total of 1.544 Mbit/s, calculated as follows:

$$\begin{align}
& \left( 24\,\frac{\mathrm{channels}}{\mathrm{frame}} \times 8\,\frac{\mathrm{bits}}{\mathrm{channel}} \times 8,000\,\frac{\mathrm{frames}}{\mathrm{second}} \right) + \left( 1\,\frac{\mathrm{framing\ bit}}{\mathrm{frame}}
\times 8,000\,\frac{\mathrm{frames}}{\mathrm{second}} \right) \\
= {} & 1,536,000\,\frac{\mathrm{bits}}{\mathrm{second}} + 8,000 \frac{\mathrm{bits}}{\mathrm{second}} \\
= {} & 1,544,000\,\frac{\mathrm{bits}}{\mathrm{second}} \\
\equiv {} & 1.544\,\frac{\mathrm{Mbit}}{\mathrm{second}}
\end{align}$$

DS1 is a full-duplex circuit, concurrently transmitting and receiving 1.544 Mbit/s.

== DS1 frame synchronization ==
Frame synchronization is necessary to identify the timeslots within each 24-channel frame. Synchronization takes place by allocating a framing, or 193rd, bit. This results in 8 kbit/s of framing data, for each DS1. Because this 8-kbit/s channel is used by the transmitting equipment as overhead, only 1.536 Mbit/s is actually passed on to the user. Two types of framing schemes are superframe (SF) and extended superframe (ESF). A superframe consists of twelve consecutive 193-bit frames, whereas an extended superframe consists of twenty-four consecutive 193-bit frames of data. Due to the unique bit sequences exchanged, the framing schemes are not compatible with each other. These two types of framing (SF, and ESF) use their 8 kbit/s framing channel in different ways.

== Connectivity and alarms ==
Connectivity refers to the ability of the digital carrier to carry customer data from either end to the other. In some cases, the connectivity may be lost in one direction and maintained in the other. In all cases, the terminal equipment, i.e., the equipment that marks the endpoints of the DS1, defines the connection by the quality of the received framing pattern.

=== Alarms ===
Alarms are normally produced by the receiving terminal equipment when the framing is compromised. There are three defined alarm indication signal states, identified by a legacy color scheme: red, yellow and blue.

Red alarm indicates the alarming equipment is unable to recover the framing reliably. Corruption or loss of the signal will produce "red alarm". Connectivity has been lost toward the alarming equipment. There is no knowledge of connectivity toward the far end.

Yellow alarm, also known as remote alarm indication (RAI), indicates reception of a data or framing pattern that reports the far end is in "red alarm". The alarm is carried differently in SF (D4) and ESF (D5) framing. For SF framed signals, the user bandwidth is manipulated and "bit two in every DS0 channel shall be a zero." The resulting loss of payload data while transmitting a yellow alarm is undesirable, and was resolved in ESF framed signals by using the data link layer. "A repeating 16-bit pattern consisting of eight 'ones' followed by eight 'zeros' shall be transmitted continuously on the ESF data link, but may be interrupted for a period not to exceed 100-ms per interruption." Both types of alarms are transmitted for the duration of the alarm condition, but for at least one second.

Blue alarm, also known as alarm indication signal (AIS) indicates a disruption in the communication path between the terminal equipment and line repeaters or DCS. If no signal is received by the intermediary equipment, it produces an unframed, all-ones signal. The receiving equipment displays a "red alarm" and sends the signal for "yellow alarm" to the far end because it has no framing, but at intermediary interfaces the equipment will report "AIS" or Alarm Indication Signal. AIS is also called "all ones" because of the data and framing pattern.

These alarm states are also lumped under the term Carrier Group Alarm (CGA). The meaning of CGA is that connectivity on the digital carrier has failed. The result of the CGA condition varies depending on the equipment function. Voice equipment typically coerces the robbed bits for signaling to a state that will result in the far end properly handling the condition, while applying an often different state to the customer equipment connected to the alarmed equipment. Simultaneously, the customer data is often coerced to a 0x7F pattern, signifying a zero-voltage condition on voice equipment. Data equipment usually passes whatever data may be present, if any, leaving it to the customer equipment to deal with the condition.

== Inband T1 versus T1 PRI ==
Additionally, for voice T1s there are two main types: so-called "plain" or Inband T1s and PRI (Primary Rate Interface). While both carry voice telephone calls in similar fashion, PRIs are commonly used in call centers and provide not only the 23 actual usable telephone lines (known as B channels for bearer) but also a 24th line (known as the D channel for data) that carries line signaling information. This special D channel carries: Caller ID (CID) and automatic number identification (ANI) data, required channel type (usually a B, or bearer, channel), call handle, Dialed Number Identification Service (DNIS) info, requested channel number and a request for response.

Inband T1s are also capable of carrying CID and ANI information if they are configured by the carrier by sending DTMF *ANI*DNIS*. However, PRIs handle this more efficiently. While an inband T1 seemingly has a slight advantage due to 24 lines being available to make calls (as opposed to a PRI that has 23), each channel in an inband T1 must perform its own setup and tear-down of each call. A PRI uses the 24th channel as a data channel to perform all the overhead operations of the other 23 channels (including CID and ANI). Although an inband T1 has 24 channels, the 23 channel PRI can set up more calls faster due to the dedicated 24th signalling channel (D Channel).

Before T1 PRI existed there was T1 CAS. T1 CAS is not common today but it still exists. CAS is Channel Associated Signaling. It is also referred to as Robbed Bit Signaling. CAS is a technology with roots in the 60's and before.

== Origin of name ==
The name T1 came from the carrier letter assigned by AT&T to the technology in 1957, when digital systems were first proposed and developed, AT&T decided to skip Q, R, and S, and to use T, for time division. The naming system ended with the letter T, which designated fiber networks. Destined successors of the T1 system of networks, called T1C, T2, T3, and T4, were not commercial successes and disappeared quickly. Signals that would have been carried on these systems, called DS1, DS2, DS3, and DS4, are now carried on T1 infrastructure.

DS-1 means Digital Service – Level 1 and has to do with the signal carried—as opposed to the network that delivers it (originally 24 digitized voice channels over a T1). Since the practice of naming networks ended with the letter T, the terms T1 and DS1 have become synonymous and encompass a variety of services including voice, data, and clear-channel pipes. The line speed is always 1.544 Mbit/s, but the payload can vary greatly.

== Alternative technologies ==
Dark fiber: Dark fiber refers to unused fibers available for use. Dark fiber has been, and still is, available for sale on the wholesale market for both metro and wide area links, but it may not be available in all markets or city pairs.

Dark fiber capacity is typically used by network operators to build SONET and dense wavelength-division multiplexing (DWDM) networks, usually involving meshes of self-healing rings. Now, it is also used by end-user enterprises to expand Ethernet local area networks, especially since the adoption of IEEE standards for gigabit Ethernet and 10 Gigabit Ethernet over single-mode fiber. Running Ethernet networks between geographically separated buildings is a practice known as "WAN elimination".

DS1C is a digital signal equivalent to two Digital Signal 1 circuits, with extra bits to conform to a signaling standard of 3.152 Mbit/s. Few (if any) of these circuit capacities are still in use today. In the early days of digital and data transmission, the three-megabit-per-second data rate was used to link mainframe computers together. The physical side of this circuit is called T1C.

== Semiconductor ==
The T1/E1 protocol is implemented as a "line interface unit" in silicon. The semiconductor chip contains a decoder/encoder, loop backs, jitter attenuators, receivers, and drivers. Additionally, there are usually multiple interfaces and they are labeled as dual, quad, octal, etc., depending upon the number.

The transceiver chip's primary purpose is to retrieve information from the "line", i.e., the conductive line that transverses distance, by receiving the pulses and converting the signal which has been subjected to noise, jitter, and other interference, to a clean digital pulse on the other interface of the chip.

== See also ==
- Digital Signal 0
- Digital Signal 3
- DS1 encoding schemes: B8ZS, HDB3, AMI
- Line code
