= Robbed-bit signaling =

Telecommunications signaling protocol

In telecommunications, robbed-bit signaling (RBS) is a scheme to provide maintenance and line signaling services on many T1 digital carrier circuits using channel-associated signaling (CAS). The T1 carrier circuit is a type of dedicated digital circuit employed in North America and Japan.

== Overview ==
T1 is a protocol for digital transmission over telephone networks. A T1 circuit combines 24 DS0 channels through time-division multiplexing. Data is transmitted in frames, where each frame contains an 8-bit sample of each of the 24 channels, plus one extra framing bit for a total of 193 bits. Each channel carries 8,000 samples per second. The frames are transmitted either in sequences of 12 frames, known as superframes (SF), or sequences of 24 frames, known as extended superframes (ESF). Robbed-bit signaling is a method to provide signaling information alongside data within a superframe. Robbed-bit signaling uses the least-significant bit of every channel in every sixth frame for signaling instead of data. These bits convey on-hook or off-hook and busy signal status on telephone lines. Since a superframe consists of 12 frames, robbed-bit signaling provides two bits for signaling per channel in a superframe, or four bits per channel in an extended superframe. The first robbed bit in a superframe is called the A bit, and the second bit is called the B bit. Extended superframes have two extra robbed bits, called the C and D bits.

Intuitively, 5 out of 6 frames have 8-bit resolution equal to 64 kbit/s (8 bits × 8,000 samples per second = 64 kbit/s) and 1 out of every 6 frames has a 7-bit resolution (7 bits × 8,000 samples per second = 56 kbit/s). The distortion effect on voice and data signals is negligible when a modem is used for modulation. However, for a 64 kbit/s digital signal, the data will render errors when a data signal is transmitted. To remove the errors, data can be transmitted 7 bits at a time instead of 8. Since robbed-bit signaling could impact voice quality and reduce data bandwidth, it was largely replaced by the Primary Rate Interface standard, which reserves one of the 24 voice channels for signaling information instead of using bits in every channel.
