= Digital Signal 3 =

Telephony call multiplexing standard

Digital Signal 3 (DS3 or T3 line) is a digital signal level 3 T-carrier. The signal rate for this type of signal is 44.736 Mbit/s (45 Mb). It can transport 28 DS1 level signals within its payload. It can transport 672 DS0 level channels within its payload.

Such circuits are the usual kind between telephony carriers, both wired and Wireless, and typically by OC1 optical connections.

== Cabling ==
DS3 interconnect cables must be made with true 75-ohm coaxial cable and connectors. Cables or connectors which are 50 ohms or which significantly deviate from 75 ohms will result in signal reflections which will lower the performance of the connection, possibly to the point of not working. GR-139-CORE, Generic Requirements for Central Office Coaxial Cable, defines type 734 and 735 cables for this application. Due to losses, there are differing distance limitations for each type of cable. Type 734 has a larger center conductor and insulator for lower losses for a given distance. The BNC connectors are also very important as are the crimping and cable stripping tools used to install them. Trompeter, Cannon, Amphenol, Kings, and Canare make some of the most reliable 75 ohm connectors known. RG-6 or even inexpensive RG-59 cable may work temporarily when properly terminated, though it does not meet telephony technical standards. Type 735 26 AWG is used for interconnects up to 225 feet, and Type 734 20 AWG is used for interconnects up to 450 feet.

== Pricing ==
DS3 service is provided to businesses in the United States through incumbent local exchange carrier and competitive local exchange carrier communication providers. The price, much like a T1 (or DS1) line, has two primary components: the loop (which is distance-sensitive) and the port (or the price the carrier charges to access the Internet through their proprietary network).

== See also ==
- Digital Signal 0
- Digital Signal 1
- DS4/NA
- Transmux
