= DS4/NA =

Telecommunications circuit

The Digital Signal 4/NA (DS4/NA) in telecommunications, is a 139.264-Mbps aggregate-multiplexed signal, equivalent to 3 Digital Signal 3s or 2,016 Digital Signal 0s.

This link is commonly used for long distance fiber carriage of broadcast radio and television as a platform for the 270 Mbps MPEG-2/ASI Transport Stream. The circuits are in common use daily for digital transmission of broadcast television and radio, interconnecting Sport Arenas, Convention Centers, Television Stations and Broadcasters. The connections themselves become part of long-haul serial data transmission over fiber. As these are sent as purely serial data, no packetizing or bandwidth sharing takes place as with TCP/IP.

Carriers usually supplying these circuits are specialized, most often supplied in the US by Lumen Technologies (was Vyvx) and Tata Communications (was The Switch).

A remote broadcast, such as a sporting event, is typically carried over a DS4 from the venue to the television network on a full, unshared ("clear") serial data circuit at 270 Mbps.

Historically, when used with the appropriate gear, the circuit was used to emulate an analog standard definition circuit using a sampling rate of 12-15 MHz, carrying the samples in PCM format. This replaced dedicated coaxial cable circuits with managed digital circuits but that use became rare in the early 21st century.

== See also ==
- Outline of telecommunication
