= E-carrier =

Telephone transmission carrier system used outside US

The E-carrier is a member of the series of carrier systems developed for digital transmission of many simultaneous telephone calls by time-division multiplexing. The European Conference of Postal and Telecommunications Administrations (CEPT) originally standardised the E-carrier system, which revised and improved the earlier American T-carrier technology, and this has now been adopted by the International Telecommunication Union Telecommunication Standardization Sector (ITU-T). It was widely used in almost all countries outside the US, Canada, and Japan. E-carrier deployments have steadily been replaced by Ethernet as telecommunication networks transition towards all IP.

== E1 frame structure ==
An E1 link operates over two separate sets of wires, usually unshielded twisted pair (balanced cable) or using coaxial (unbalanced cable). A nominal 3 volt peak signal is encoded with pulses using a method avoiding long periods without polarity changes. The line data rate is 2.048 Mbit/s (full duplex, i.e. 2.048 Mbit/s downstream and 2.048 Mbit/s upstream) which is split into 32 timeslots, each being allocated 8 bits in turn. Thus each timeslot sends and receives an 8-bit PCM sample, usually encoded according to A-law algorithm, 8,000 times per second (8 × 8,000 × 32 = 2,048,000). This is ideal for voice telephone calls where the voice is sampled at that data rate and reconstructed at the other end. The timeslots are numbered from 0 to 31.

=== Special timeslots ===
One timeslot (TS0) is reserved for framing purposes, and alternately transmits a fixed pattern. This allows the receiver to lock onto the start of each frame and match up each channel in turn. The standards allow for a full cyclic redundancy check to be performed across all bits transmitted in each frame, to detect if the circuit is losing bits (information), but this is not always used. An alarm signal may also be transmitted using timeslot TS0. Finally, some bits are reserved for national use.

One timeslot (TS16) is often reserved for signalling purposes, to control call setup and teardown according to one of several standard telecommunications protocols. This includes channel-associated signaling (CAS) where a set of bits is used to replicate opening and closing the circuit (as if picking up the telephone receiver and pulsing digits on a rotary phone), or using tone signalling which is passed through on the voice circuits themselves. More recent systems use common-channel signaling (CCS) such Signalling System 7 (SS7) where no particular timeslot is reserved for signalling purposes, the signalling protocol being transmitted on a freely chosen set of timeslots or on a different physical channel.

When using E1 frames for data communication, some systems use those timeslots slightly differently, either

- TS0: Framing, TS1–TS31: Data traffic — This is named Channelized E1, and is used where the framing is required, it allows any of the 32 timeslots to be identified and extracted.
- TS0–TS31: Data traffic — Often referred to as Clear Channel E1 or Unchannelized, it is used where no framing is required, timeslot extraction is not required and the full bandwidth (2 Mb/s) is required.

== Hierarchy levels ==
The PDH based on the E0 signal rate is designed so that each higher level can multiplex a set of lower level signals. Framed E1 is designed to carry 30 or 31 E0 data channels plus 1 or 2 special channels, all other levels are designed to carry 4 signals from the level below. Because of the necessity for overhead bits, and justification bits to account for rate differences between sections of the network, each subsequent level has a capacity greater than would be expected from simply multiplying the lower level signal rate (so for example E2 is 8.448 Mbit/s and not 8.192 Mbit/s as one might expect when multiplying the E1 rate by 4).

Note, because bit interleaving is used, it is very difficult to demultiplex low level tributaries directly, requiring equipment to individually demultiplex every single level down to the one that is required.

== See also ==
- D 0 (DS0)
- Digital Signal 1 (DS1, T1)
- HDB3 encoding scheme
- List of device bandwidths
- Multiplexing
- Plesiochronous Digital Hierarchy
- STM-1
- T-carrier
- Time-division multiplexing
- Nonblocking minimal spanning switch - discussion of practical telephone switches.
- Clos network - the mathematics of telephone switches.
