= Cisco 2500 series =

Network Router

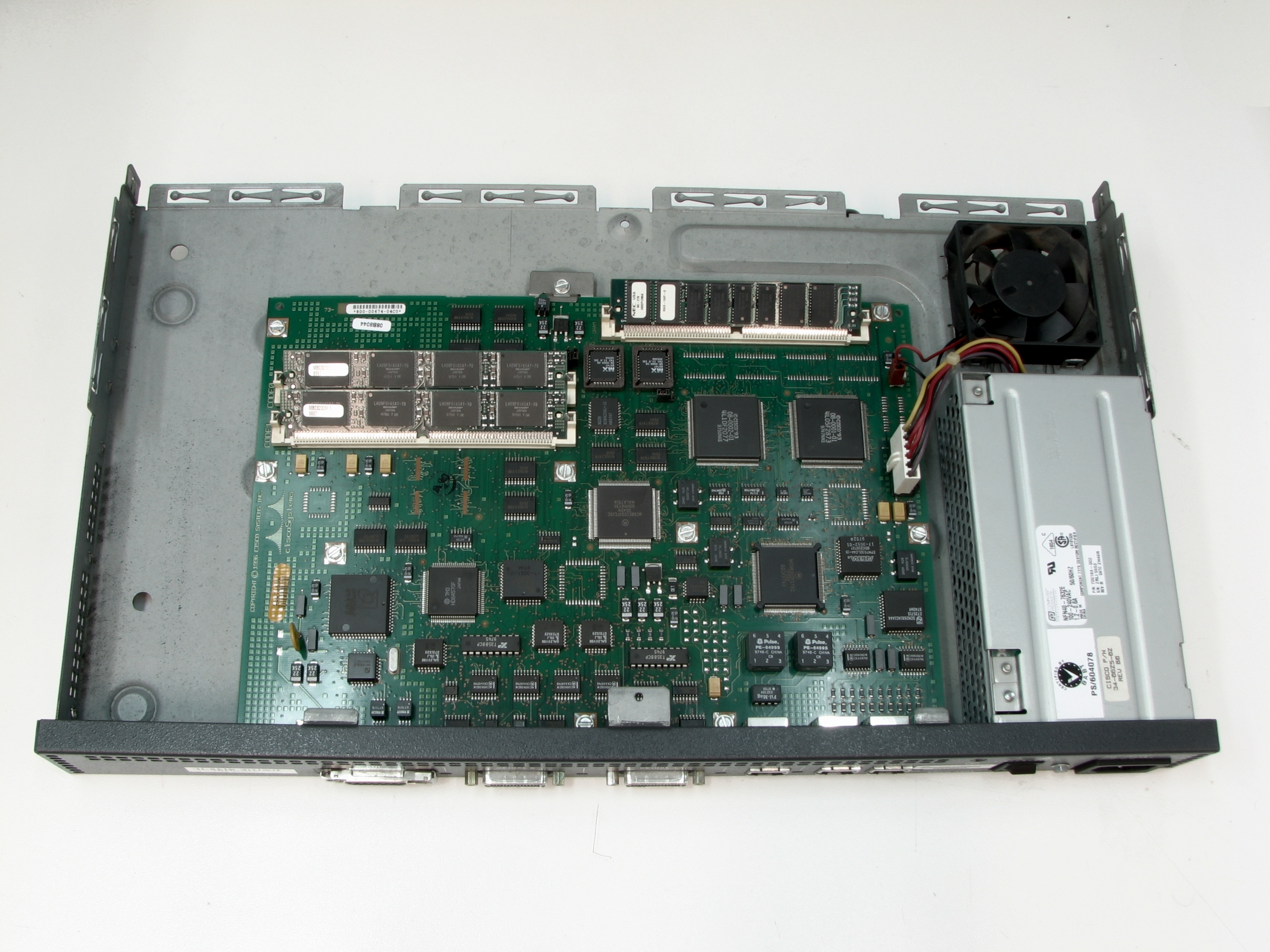
Cisco 2503 with top cover removed.

The Cisco 2500 series routers are a series of 19" rack mount access routers typically used to connect Ethernet or Token Ring networks via ISDN or leased serial connections (i.e. Frame Relay, T1 etc.). The routers are based on a Motorola 68EC030 CISC processor. This line of routers is no longer sold or supported by Cisco Systems. They were superseded by the Cisco 2600 series, which has also reached End-of-Life now.

== Specifications ==
- CPU: Motorola 68EC030 20 MHz (some 25 MHz) (32 bit, 256 bytes internal Data Cache, 256 bytes internal Instruction Cache)
- RAM: Up to 16 MB
- Flash: 4, 8 or 16 MB
- Power consumption: 40 W
- Dimensions: 4.44 × 44.45 × 26.82 cm (standard 19-inch rackmount – 1RU)
- Weight: 4.5 kg
- Power supplies: 110/240 V AC or 48 V DC
- Supported interfaces: Ethernet (10 Mbit/s), Token Ring (16 Mbit/s), ISDN BRI (128 kbit/s), Sync Serial (2 Mbit/s), Async Serial.
- Bandwidth: 4400 packets-per-second (using CEF)
- Typical throughput: 2.2 Mbit/s (64-byte packets) 6–8 Mbit (1500-byte packets)

== Models available ==
Fixed Configuration Routers
| Model | Ethernet AUI | Token Ring | Serial (Sync) (DB60) | ISDN BRI | Serial (Async) | Hub | Notes |
|---|---|---|---|---|---|---|---|
| 2501 | 1 10Mbit/s | – | 2 | – | – | – | Multiprotocol Router |
| 2502 | – | 1 | 2 | – | – | – | Multiprotocol Router |
| 2503 | 1 10Mbit/s | – | 2 | 1 | – | – | Multiprotocol Router |
| 2504 | – | 1 | 2 | 1 | – | – | Multiprotocol Router |
| 2505 | – | – | 2 | – | – | 8 10Mbit/s | Router/hub |
| 2507 | – | – | 2 | – | – | 16 10Mbit/s | Router/hub |
| 2509 | 1 10Mbit/s | – | 2 | – | 8 (HD-68) | – | Router/access server |
| 2509-ET | 1 10Mbit/s | – | 2 | – | 8 (HD-68) | – | Extended-temperature general purpose access server; available in the U.S. only |
| AS2509-RJ | 1 10Mbit/s | – | 2 | – | 8 (8x RJ45) | – | Access Server |
| 2510 | – | 1 | 2 | – | 8 (HD-68) | – | Router/access server |
| 2511 | 1 10Mbit/s | – | 2 | – | 16 (2x HD-68) | – | Router/access server |
| AS2511-RJ | 1 10Mbit/s | – | 2 | – | 16 (16x RJ45) | – | Router/access server |
| 2512 | – | 1 | 2 | – | 16 (2x HD-68) | – | Router/access server |
| 2513 | 1 10Mbit/s | 1 | 2 | – | – | – | Dual LAN/multiprotocol router |
| 2514 | 2 10Mbit/s | – | 2 | – | – | – | Dual LAN/multiprotocol router |
| 2515 | – | 2 | 2 | – | – | – | Dual LAN/multiprotocol router |
| 2516 | 1 10Mbit/s | – | 2 | 1 | – | 14 10Mbit/s | Router/hub |
| 2520 | 1 10Mbit/s | – | 2 | 1 | 2 Low-speed (2x DB60) | – | Multiport serial routers |
| 2521 | – | 1 | 2 | 1 | 2 Low-speed (2x DB60) | – | Multiport serial routers |
| 2522 | 1 10Mbit/s | – | 2 | 1 | 8 Low-speed (8x DB60) | – | Multiport serial routers |
| 2523 | – | 1 | 2 | 1 | 8 Low-speed (8x DB60) | – | Multiport serial routers |

Semi-Modular Routers
| Model | Ethernet AUI | Token Ring | Serial (sync) | ISDN BRI | Hub Module | Notes |
|---|---|---|---|---|---|---|
| 2517 | – | 1 | 2 | 1 | 11 available after connection with router | Router/Token Ring Hub |
| 2518 | 1 10Mbit/s | – | 2 | 1 | 23 available after connection with router | Router/Ethernet Hub |
| 2519 | – | 1 | 2 | 1 | 23 available after connection with router Two distinct rings available | Router/Token Ring Hub |

Modular Routers
| Model | Ethernet | Token Ring | Available WAN modules | Notes |
|---|---|---|---|---|
| 2524 | 1 AUI or RJ-45 | – | 2-wire switched 56 kbit/s DSU/CSU; 4-wire 56/64 kbit/s DSU/CSU; Fractional T1/t1 DSU/CSU; 5-in-one Serial (Sync); ISDN BRI (optional NT1); ISDN BRI with integrated NT1 | 3 WAN interface module slots: •2 Serial (Sync) •1 ISDN |
| 2525 | – | 1 STP(DB-9) or UTP(RJ-45) | 2-wire switched 56 kbit/s DSU/CSU; 4-wire 56/64 kbit/s DSU/CSU; Fractional T1/t1 DSU/CSU; 5-in-one Serial (Sync); ISDN BRI (optional NT1); ISDN BRI with integrated NT1 | 3 WAN interface module slots: •2 Serial (Sync) •1 ISDN |

== Modular Routers ==
The modular routers had 3 interface slots available – 2 Synchronous Serial and 1 ISDN. The ISDN modules were keyed so as not to be inserted into a Synchronous WAN module slot.

The following modules were available:

- 2-wire, switched 56-kbit/s DSU/CSU (RJ11)
- 4-wire, 56/64-kbit/s DSU/CSU (RJ48S)
- Fractional T1/T1 DSU/CSU (RJ48C)
- Five-in-one synchronous serial (DB60) (Supported five signalling types – EIA/TIA-232, EIA/TIA-449, V.35, X.21 and EIA-530).
- ISDN BRI (S/T) (RJ45)
- ISDN with integrated NT1 device (U) (RJ45)

== CiscoPro Routers ==
These routers were repackaged versions of the 2500 specifically to be sold through channel partners to small and medium businesses that needed a greater ease of setup. They were offered at a reduced price due to their reduced software feature set. They are characterized by a light grey/cream colored case compared to the standard dark grey colouring.

== Mission-Specific Routers ==
'Mission-specific' models contained less memory and less hardware functionality, and were tailored to support only a subset of protocols. A 'Mission-specific' model could be upgraded to full router capability by installing a full featured IOS image and (if necessary) adding memory. There routers were mainly intended to be frame relay access devices.

The software images installed on these devices intentionally crippled the hardware (for example on-board Ethernet port on the 2501CF was disabled, and the 2503I disabled both on-board serial ports).

'Mission-specific' models included 2501CF, 2501LF, 2502CF, 2502LF, 2503I, 2504I, 2520CF, 2520LF, 2521CF, 2521LF, 2522CF, 2522LF, 2523CF and 2523LF.

The 'CF' in the model number stood for CFRAD software (Cisco Frame Relay Access Device), and the 'LF' stood for LAN FRAD (Local Area Network Frame Relay Access Device – i.e. Ethernet/Token Ring to Frame Relay). 'I' referred to an ISDN access device.

Pricing (Circa 1995) – 2520CF US$1,595 to 2523LF US$3,995

== RAM/FLASH ==
=== RAM ===
The 2500 series uses a single 72pin FPM (70ns) SIMM with parity, and can take a maximum of 16 MB.

System boards with a revision 'A' through 'G', have an additional 2 MB of RAM soldered to the system card. Revisions 'I' through 'N' do not have any RAM soldered to the system card. This means total RAM can be 18 MB on routers having the additional 2 MB on board.

On system boards with on board RAM, the SIMM socket may be left unpopulated.

=== FLASH ===
There are 2 Flash Memory sockets available (80pin, 120ns), with the maximum flash memory supported being 16 MB. Standard flash memory was 8 MB on most routers and 4 mb on 'Mission Specific' models. A boot ROM upgrade may be needed to use 16 MB of flash. The 2500 ran its IOS directly from flash memory.

An erasable, programmable read-only memory (EPROM) of 2 MB in size was used to permanently store the startup diagnostic code (ROM Monitor), and RxBoot. This ROM was held in 2x PLCC sockets and was user upgradeable.

Each unit had 32k of NVRAM, used for storage of the startup configuration.

Some 2500 models (e.g. 2511) had a PCMCIA slot installed on the board. It was intended that Cisco would send IOS updates on PCMCIA, which would then update the router. Support for this was very limited, and the device was read only.

== Software ==
The 2500 series ran Cisco IOS (Internetworking Operating System). The initial IOS release for this model was 11.0, and the final release was 12.2(4)T or 12.3(26).

On the 2500 software upgrade required booting to a BOOTROM OS with reduced functionality to have write access on the flash file system. The BOOTROM OS did not support Tokenring interfaces, making software upgrade more complex. On more recent models, the software is a compressed file on flash that first need to be extracted in RAM. As a result, the flash file systems on those routers was read/write during operation and software installation could be done during runtime.

=== IOS Feature Sets ===
The following IOS feature sets were available

- IP Routing
- IP Routing Plus
- IP/IPX with IBM base functionality and APPN
- Desktop (IP/IPX/AppleTalk/DEC)
- Desktop (IP/IPX/AppleTalk/DEC) Plus
- Enterprise
- Enterprise Plus
- Enterprise/APPN/Plus
- Mission-specific Cisco 2500 series: application-specific software

The encryption on these models was restricted to DES (no 3DES supported), restricting the encryption of IPsec and SSH.

=== Alternative OS ===
uClinux is a free software project that allows a stripped down Linux installation to be run on the Cisco 2500.

== History ==
The Cisco 2500 series was introduced in 1993 and sold until 2001. They were superseded by the Cisco 2600 series.

List pricing (circa 1995) ranged from US$1,595 for the 2520CF up to US$5,995 for the 2519.

== See also ==
- Cisco routers
