= Leased line =

Private telecommunication circuit

A leased line is a private telecommunication circuit between two or more locations provided according to a commercial contract. It is sometimes also known as a private circuit, private connect, and as a data line. Traditionally, leased lines were used by businesses to connect geographically distant offices for phone and networking. More recently leased lines are used to establish connectivity between businesses for networking between private Data center, Colocation data centre (Colo), and their public clouds.

Unlike traditional telephone lines in the public switched telephone network (PSTN) leased lines are generally not switched circuits, and therefore do not have an associated telephone number. Each side of the line is permanently connected, always active and dedicated to the other. Leased lines can be used for telephone, Internet, or other data communication services. Some are ringdown services, and some connect to a private branch exchange (PBX) or network router.

The primary factors affecting the recurring lease fees are the distance between end stations and the bandwidth of the circuit. Since the connection does not carry third-party communications, the carrier can assure a specified level of quality.

An Internet leased line is a premium Internet connectivity product, normally delivered over fiber, which provides uncontended, symmetrical bandwidth with full-duplex traffic. It is also known as an Ethernet leased line, dedicated line, data circuit or private line.

== History ==
Leased line services (or private line services) became digital in the 1970s with the conversion of the Bell backbone network from analog to digital circuits. This allowed AT&T to offer Dataphone Digital Services (later re-branded digital data services) that started the deployment of ISDN and T1 lines to customer premises to connect.

Leased lines were used to connect mainframe computers with terminals and remote sites, via IBM's Systems Network Architecture (created in 1974) or DEC's DECnet (created in 1975).

With the extension of digital services in the 1980s, leased lines were used to connect customer premises to Frame Relay or ATM networks. Access data rates increased from the original T1 option with maximum transmission speed of 1.544 Mbit/s up to T3 circuits.

In the 1990s, with the advances of the Internet, leased lines were also used to connect customer premises to ISP point of presence whilst the following decade saw a convergence of the aforementioned services (frame relay, ATM, Internet for businesses) with the MPLS integrated offerings.

Access data rates also evolved dramatically to speeds of up to 10 Gbit/s in the early 21st century with the Internet boom and increased offering in long-haul optical networks or metropolitan area networks.

== Applications ==

Leased lines are used to build up private networks, private telephone networks (by interconnecting PBXs) or access the internet or a partner network (extranet).

Here is a review of the leased-line applications in network designs over time:

=== Site to site data connectivity ===
Terminating a leased line with two routers can extend network capabilities across sites. Leased lines were first used in the 1970s by enterprise with proprietary protocols such as IBM System Network Architecture and Digital Equipment DECnet, and with TCP/IP in University and Research networks before the Internet became widely available. Note that other Layer 3 protocols were used such as Novell IPX on enterprise networks until TCP/IP became ubiquitous in the 2000s. Today, point to point data circuits are typically provisioned as either TDM, Ethernet, or Layer 3 MPLS.

In recent years, leased-line services have increasingly been used for hybrid-cloud and data-centre interconnection, not just for traditional site-to-site office connectivity. Businesses now often subscribe to dedicated fibre- or Ethernet-based circuits with guaranteed symmetrical bandwidth and full-duplex traffic to link their on-premises sites and cloud infrastructure under service-level agreements.

=== Site to site PBX connectivity ===
Terminating a leased line with two PBX allowed customers to by-pass PSTN for inter-site telephony. This allowed the customers to manage their own dial plan (and to use short extensions for internal telephone number) as well as to make significant savings if enough voice traffic was carried across the line (especially when the savings on the telephone bill exceeded the fixed cost of the leased line).

=== Site to network connectivity ===
As demand grew on data network telcos started to build more advanced networks using packet switching on top of their infrastructure. Thus, a number of telecommunication companies added ATM, Frame-relay or ISDN offerings to their services portfolio. Leased lines were used to connect the customer site to the telco network access point.

=== International private leased circuit ===
An international private leased circuit (IPLC) functions as a point-to-point private line. IPLCs are usually time-division multiplexing (TDM) circuits that utilize the same circuit amongst many customers. The nature of TDM requires the use of a CSU/DSU and a router. Usually the router will include the CSU/DSU.

Then came the Internet (in the mid-1990s) and since then the most common application for leased line is to connect a customer to its ISP point of presence. With the changes that the Internet brought in the networking world other technologies were developed to propose alternatives to frame-relay or ATM networks such as VPNs (hardware and software) and MPLS networks (that are in effect an upgrade to TCP/IP of existing ATM/frame-relay infrastructures).

== Availability ==
=== In the United Kingdom ===
In the UK, leased lines are available at speeds from 64 kbit/s increasing in 64 kbit/s increments to 2.048 Mbit/s over a channelised E1 tail circuit and at speeds between 2.048 Mbit/s to 34.368 Mbit/s via channelised E3 tail circuits. The NTE will terminate the circuit and provide the requested presentation most frequently X.21 however higher speed interfaces are available such as G.703 or 10BASE-T. Some ISPs however use the term more loosely, defining a leased line as “any dedicated bandwidth service delivered over a leased fibre connection".

As of March 2018, Leased Line services are most commonly available in the region of 100 Mbit/s to 1 Gbit/s. In large cities, for example, London, speeds of 10 Gbit/s are attainable.

=== In the United States ===
In the U.S., low-speed leased lines (56 kbit/s and below) are usually provided using analog modems. Higher-speed leased lines are usually presented using FT1 (Fractional T1): a T1 bearer circuit with 1 to 24, 56k or 64k timeslots. Customers typically manage their own network termination equipment, which include a Channel Service Unit and Data Service Unit (CSU/DSU).

=== In Hong Kong ===
In Hong Kong, leased lines are usually available at speeds of 64k, 128k, 256k, 512k, T1 (channelized or not) or E1 (less common). Whatever the speed, telcos usually provide the CSU/DSU and present to the customer on V.35 interface.

Fibre circuits are slowly replacing the traditional circuits and are available at nearly any bandwidth.

=== In India ===
In India, leased lines are available at speeds of 64 kbit/s, 128 kbit/s, 256 kbit/s, 512 kbit/s, 1 Mbit/s, 2 Mbit/s, 4 Mbit/s, 8 Mbit/s, 1000 Mbit/s T1(1.544 Mbit/s) or E1(2.048 Mbit/s) and up to 622 Mbit/s. Customers are connected either through OFC, telephone lines, ADSL, or through Wi-Fi. Customers would have to manage their own network termination equipment, namely the channel service unit and data service unit.

=== In Italy ===
In Italy, leased lines are available at speeds of 64 kbit/s (terminated by DCE2 or DCE2plus modem) or multiple of 64 kbit/s from 128 kbit/s up to framed or unframed E1 (DCE3 modem) in digital form (PDH service, known as CDN, Circuito Diretto Numerico). Local telephone companies also may provide CDA (Circuito Diretto Analogico), that are plain copper dry pair between two buildings, without any line termination: in the past (pre-2002) a full analog base band was provided, giving an option to customer to deploy xDSL technology between sites: nowadays everything is limited at 4 kHz of bearer channel, so the service is just a POTS connection without any setup channel.

For many purposes, leased lines are gradually being replaced by DSL and metro Ethernet.

== Leased line alternatives ==
Leased lines are more expensive than alternative connectivity services including (ADSL, SDSL, etc.) because they are reserved exclusively to the leaseholder. Some internet service providers have therefore developed alternative products that aim to deliver leased-line type services (carrier Ethernet-based, zero contention, guaranteed availability), with more moderate bandwidth, over the standard UK national broadband network. While a leased line is full-duplex, most leased line alternatives provide only half-duplex or in many cases asymmetrical service.

== See also ==
- Circuit ID
- Dark fibre
- Dry loop
- Tie line (telephony)
