= Terminal adapter =

A terminal adapter or TA is a device that connects a terminal device – a computer, a mobile communications device, or other – to a communications network.

== ISDN ==
In ISDN terminology, the terminal adapter connects a terminal (computer) to the ISDN network. The TA therefore fulfills a similar function to the ones a modem has on the POTS network, and is therefore sometimes called an ISDN modem. The latter term, however, is partially misleading as there is no modulation or demodulation performed.

There are devices on the market that combine the functions of an ISDN TA with those of a classical modem (with an ISDN line interface). These combined TA/modems permit connections from both ISDN and analog-line/modem counterparts. In addition, a TA may contain an interface and codec for one or more analog telephone lines (aka a/b line), allowing an existing POTS installation to be upgraded to ISDN without changing phones.

Terminal adapters typically connect to a basic rate interface (S0, sometimes also U0). On the terminal side, the most popular interfaces are RS-232 serial and USB; others like V.35 or RS-449 are only of historical interest.

Devices connecting ISDN to a network (e.g. Ethernet) commonly include routing functionality; while they technically include a TA function, they are referred to as (ISDN) routers.

== Mobile networks ==
In mobile networks, the terminal adapter is used by the terminal equipment to access the mobile termination, using AT commands (see Hayes command set).

In 2G (such as GSM or CDMA), the terminal adapter is a theoretically optional while in 3G (such as W-CDMA), the terminal adapter is mandatory and is part of the mobile termination.

== Automation industry ==
In the automation industry, a terminal adapter is a passive device that converts a connector like the 8P8C (RJ-45) modular connector or 9 pin D-Sub into a terminal block to facilitate wiring. It is often used when daisy chain wiring is necessary on a multi-node serial communication network like RS-485 or RS-422.

== See also ==
- Federal Standard 1037C
