= T interface =

A T-interface or T reference point is used for basic rate access in an Integrated Services Digital Network (ISDN) environment. It is a User–network interface reference point that is characterized by a four-wire, 144 kbit/s (2B+D) user rate.

Other characteristics of a T-interface are:

- it accommodates the link access and transport layer function in the ISDN architecture
- it is located at the user premises
- it is distance sensitive to the servicing Network termination 1
- it functions in a manner similar to that of the Channel service units (CSUs) and the Data service units (DSUs).

The T interface is electrically equivalent to the S interface, and the two are jointly referred to as the S/T interface.

== See also ==
- R interface
- S interface
- U interface
