= NT1 =

NT1 may refer to:

- TFX (TV channel), formerly NT1, a French television channel
- Network termination 1 in digital telephony
- New Standard D-29, U.S. Navy trainer designated "NT-1"
