= CSU =

CSU may refer to:

== Universities and university systems ==
=== United States ===
- Columbia Southern University, in Orange Beach, Alabama
- California State University system
- Colorado State University, in Fort Collins, Colorado
- Connecticut State University System
- Columbus State University, in Columbus, Georgia
- Clayton State University, in Morrow, Georgia
- Chicago State University, in Chicago, Illinois
- Coppin State University, in Baltimore, Maryland
- Cleveland State University, in Cleveland, Ohio
- Central State University, in Wilberforce, Ohio
- Charleston Southern University, in Charleston, South Carolina
- Cardinal Stritch University, in Milwaukee, Wisconsin

=== Philippines ===
- Cagayan State University
- Caraga State University system

=== Other countries ===
- Central Sanskrit University, New Delhi, India
- Central South University, Changsha, Hunan, China
- Charles Sturt University, Australia
- Chelyabinsk State University, Chelyabinsk, Russia
- Cheng Shiu University, Kaohsiung, Taiwan
- Concordia Student Union, the organization representing undergraduate students at Concordia University in Montreal, Quebec, Canada

== Organizations ==
- Christian Social Union (UK), an Anglican social gospel organisation
- Christian Social Union in Bavaria, a political party in Bavaria, Germany
- Civil Service Union, a defunct trade union in the United Kingdom
- Český statistický úřad, Czech Statistical Office

== Other uses ==
- Channel service unit, a Wide area network equivalent of a network interface card
- Chari Aviation Services, Chad, by ICAO airline code
- Chronic spontaneous urticaria, an autoimmune condition
- Constant speed unit, a mechanical device on an aircraft propeller that regulates engine speed by automatically changing pitch
- Crime Scene Unit, a forensic in some police groups this refers to crime scene investigators who respond to a crime scene
