= WAN Interface Card =

Cisco WIC-1SHDSL v2

A WAN interface card (WIC) is a type of specialized network interface controller card (NIC) made by Cisco that allows a network device such as a router to connect and transmit data over a wide area network. A WIC has a built-in channel service data unit (CSU/DSU) interface to connect to a digital circuit and provide error correction and line monitoring.

A WIC is inserted into a WIC (or HWIC, or EHWIC) expansion slot in a Cisco device. According to Cisco, "Cisco interface cards are classified according to the technologies they support. For example, WAN interface cards (WICs) support WAN technologies, such as Gigabit Ethernet; and voice interface cards (VICs) support voice technologies. Voice/WAN interface cards (VWICs) can support voice, data, and voice and data applications, depending on the capabilities of the router in which the VWIC is installed." The WIC is supported by many Cisco devices, particularly their branch routers including the 2500 series routers and its successors.

There are several types of Cisco Interface Card. Cisco introduced the High Speed WIC, or "HWIC" with the x800 series of Cisco Integrated Service Router including the 1800, 2800, and 3800 series'. The HWIC interface is limited to 400 mega-bits per second bandwidth bidirectional. With the ISR G2 x900 series Cisco introduced the Enhanced HWIC. The ehwic operates at 800 Mbit/s, twice the bandwidth of the HWIC.

== See also ==
- Cisco routers
- Cisco 2500 series
