= NT-1 =

NT-1 may refer to:

- New Standard D-29, a trainer aircraft produced in the US from 1929 to 1930
- Network termination 1, a functional grouping of customer-premises equipment in Integrated Services Digital Networks (ISDN)
- Mackenzie Highway, abbreviated NT-1
