= Network Termination Device (NBN) =

Australian network interface device

A Network Termination Device (NTD), network termination (NT), or NTE (for network termination equipment) is a customer-side network interface device used by the Australian National Broadband Network (NBN). Network termination devices provide multiple bridges for customers to access the NBN. There are different types of NTDs for the various connection technologies encompassed by NBN. All connection types except FTTN use NTDs on premises. Depending on the kind of link, NTDs typically provide up to two telephony and four data channels. An external power source is required, and an uninterruptible power supply (UPS) can be used to maintain connection in power outages (battery backups are available for the FTTP NTD). FTTC requires power to be provided from the premises to the kerb (distribution point).

NTDs provide user–network interface (UNI) connections for connection of in-premises devices. They typically have multiple RJ45 jacks for the UNI-D (data) connection, and some models have RJ11 jacks for the UNI-V (voice) connection. All NTDs are capable of passing VoIP traffic. FTTN requires premises to have a compatible VDSL2 modem. Each UNI-D port can be activated by retail service providers for different NBN services. The NTD cannot be used as a Layer 3 router for in-premises networking.

Most devices used in NBN are produced by Alcatel-Lucent, currently a division of Nokia Corporation. In FTTC networks, the hardware from domestic manufacturers CASA Systems (formerly NetComm) and Adtran are used (noting that the device is formally called an NCD), and in HFC networks from Arris, currently a division of CommScope. FTTN networks, based on VDSL2 technology, can be accessed with any compatible modem or router that supports VDSL2. NBN itself doesn't sell any VDSL2-compatible hardware and it must be supplied by end-user of the network.

The network termination used in the specific case of an ISDN Basic Rate Interface is called an NT1.

In 2025 a new series of devices was released for the 2gbps upgrades for the FTTP and HFC networks. On the HFC network the new NTD will be an ARRIS CM3500B/AU. There will be at least two FTTP models, one being a Nokia XS-010X-Q with a single service port capable of up to 10gbe symmetrical speeds, and a larger 4 port device from Sercomm capable of sustaining 4 individual services that is intended for business and multi-resident properties.

The NBN have also used the Nokia U-010Y-A for testing and display purposes at the NBN Discovery exhibition area at the NBN Headquarters in Sydney. This device is capable of 25 Gb/s symmetrical speed using 25G PON with two SFP28 ports for the incoming and outgoing connection.

== Network technologies ==
Comparison of NTDs for different network technologies
Technology	Model	Upstream protocol	UNI-V jacks	UNI-D jacks	Alternative names	Notes
FTTP	Alcatel-Lucent G-240G-P	GPON	2	4		
FTTP	Nokia XS-010X-Q	XGS-PON	0	1		Introduced in 2025 for NBN Hyperfast FTTP services that require a 2.5 Gbps ethernet port. If the NBN model is identical to the stock configuration it is capable of 10gbe symmetrical.
FTTP	Nokia U-010Y-A	25G-PON	0	1 (SFP28)		Used for testing purposes to display extremely high end commercial speeds using 25 Gb/s symmetrical SFP28 ports.
FTTB/N	None (end-user modem)	VDSL2	0	0	VDSL2 modem	The UNI for a FTTB/N service is a copper pair termination in the premises (at the building MDF) carrying a VDSL2 signal. UNI-V or UNI-D style functionality is provided by the CPE modem/router supplied by the customer or end user.
FTTC	Casa Systems (previously NetcommWireless) NDD-0300	VDSL2	0	1	Network connection device (NCD) or FTTC connection device. FTTC was previously known as fibre to the distribution point (FTTdp).	A distribution point unit (DPU), is located near the property boundary inside a Telstra pit on the street and can service up to 4 connections.; The DPU is an Adtran 504VG powered from the mains-powered NDD-0300 NTDs installed for each NBN connection within the premises served (the NTD provides 60VDC to deliver 48VDC at the DPU, allowing for line resistance).
HFC	Arris CM8200(B)	DOCSIS 3.0	0	2	Cable modem	Only one UNI-D port (UNI-D 1) is supported for use.
HFC	Arris CM3500B/AU	DOCSIS 3.1	0	1	Cable modem	Introduced in 2025 for NBN Hyperfast HFC services that require a 2.5 Gbps ethernet port.
Fixed wireless	Alcatel-Lucent	LTE	0	4	NBN connection box or indoor unit (IDU) or 4G modem	Where a plain old telephone service (POTS) is in place, this can be kept
Satellite	ViaSAT Residential Broadband Terminal 1240		0	4	Indoor unit (IDU)	Where a POTS connection is in place, this can be kept; Part of the very small aperture terminal (VSAT) system

== Gallery ==
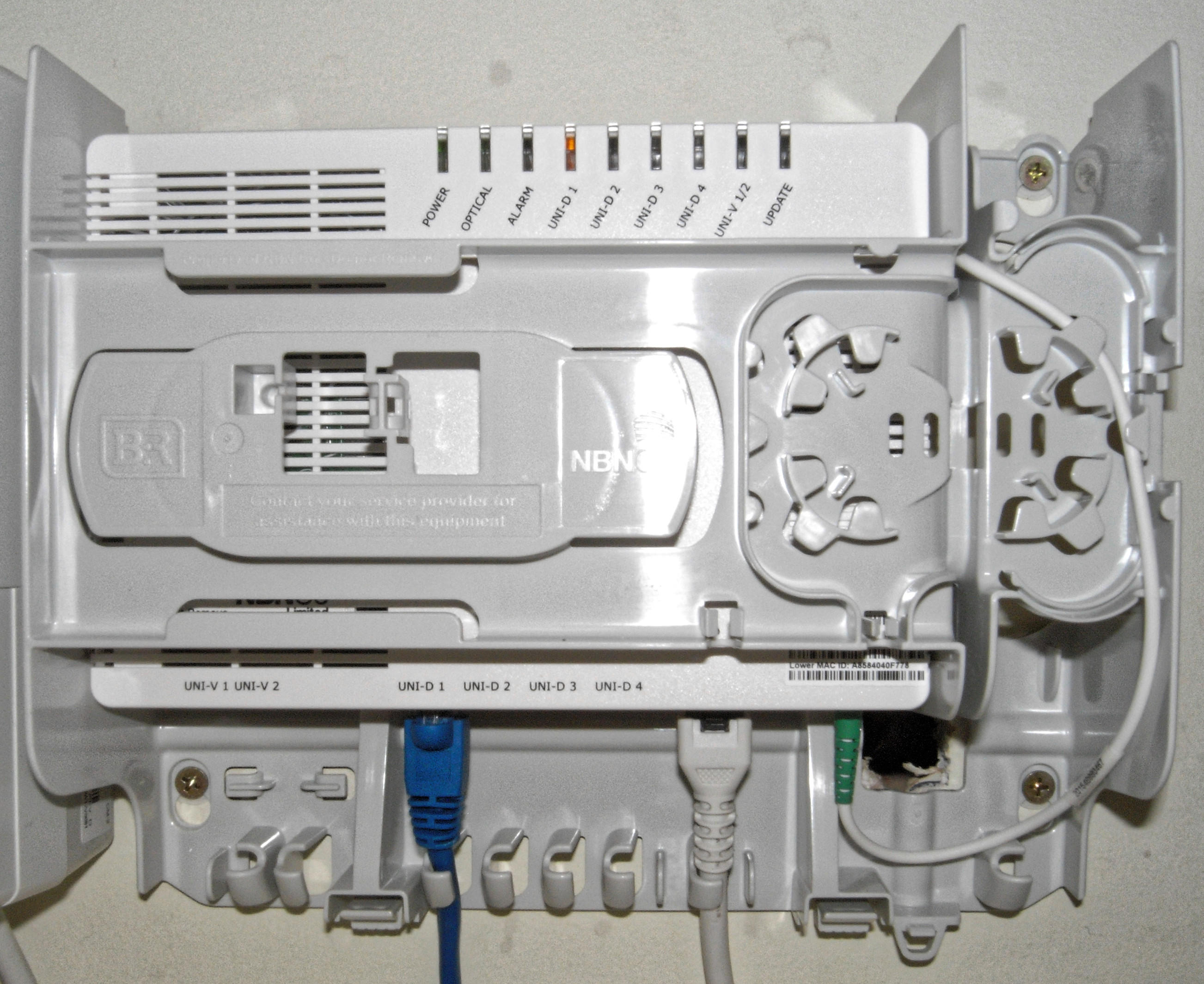
FTTP NTD (cover removed), showing Ethernet, power and fibre connections

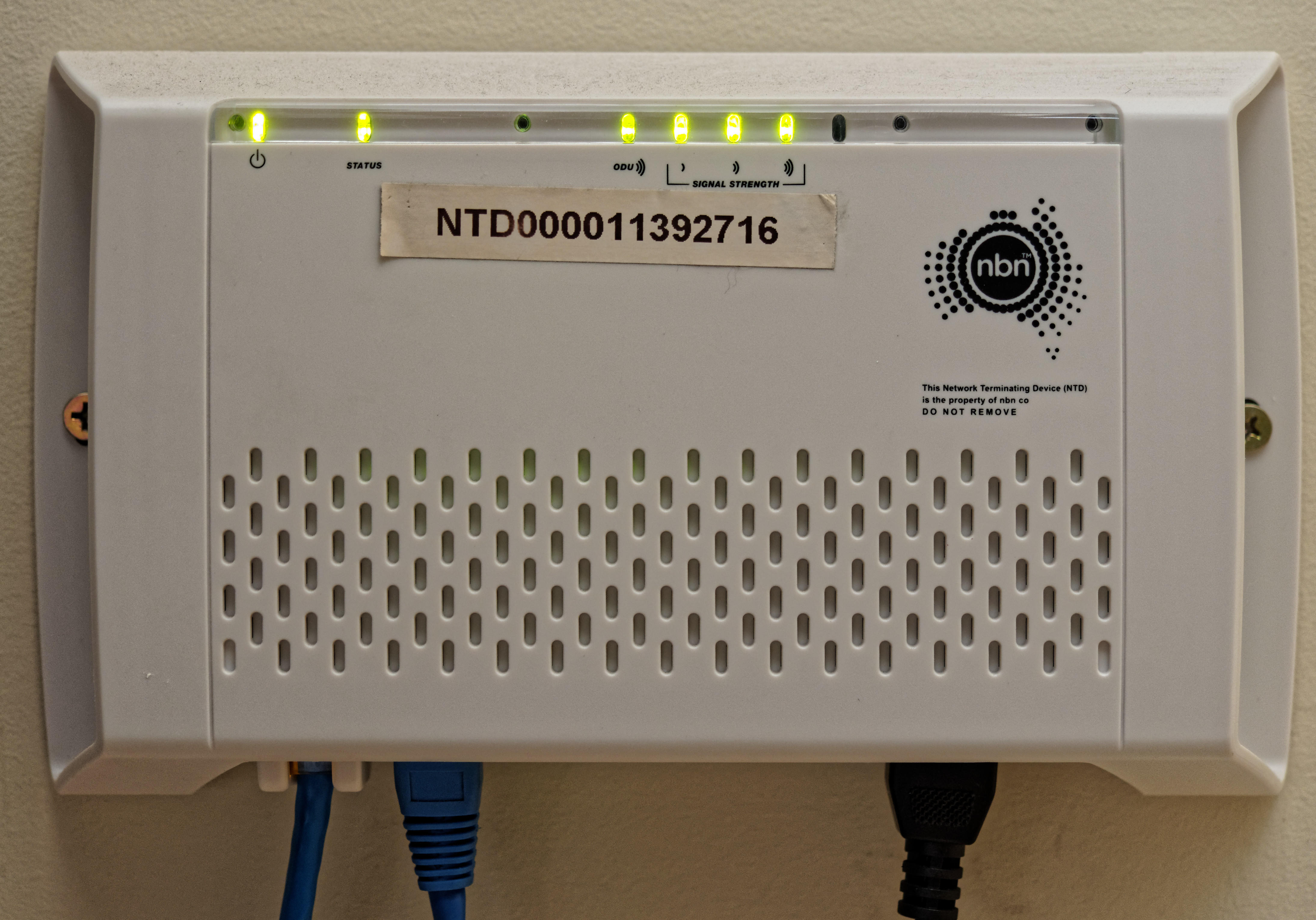
Fixed wireless NTD

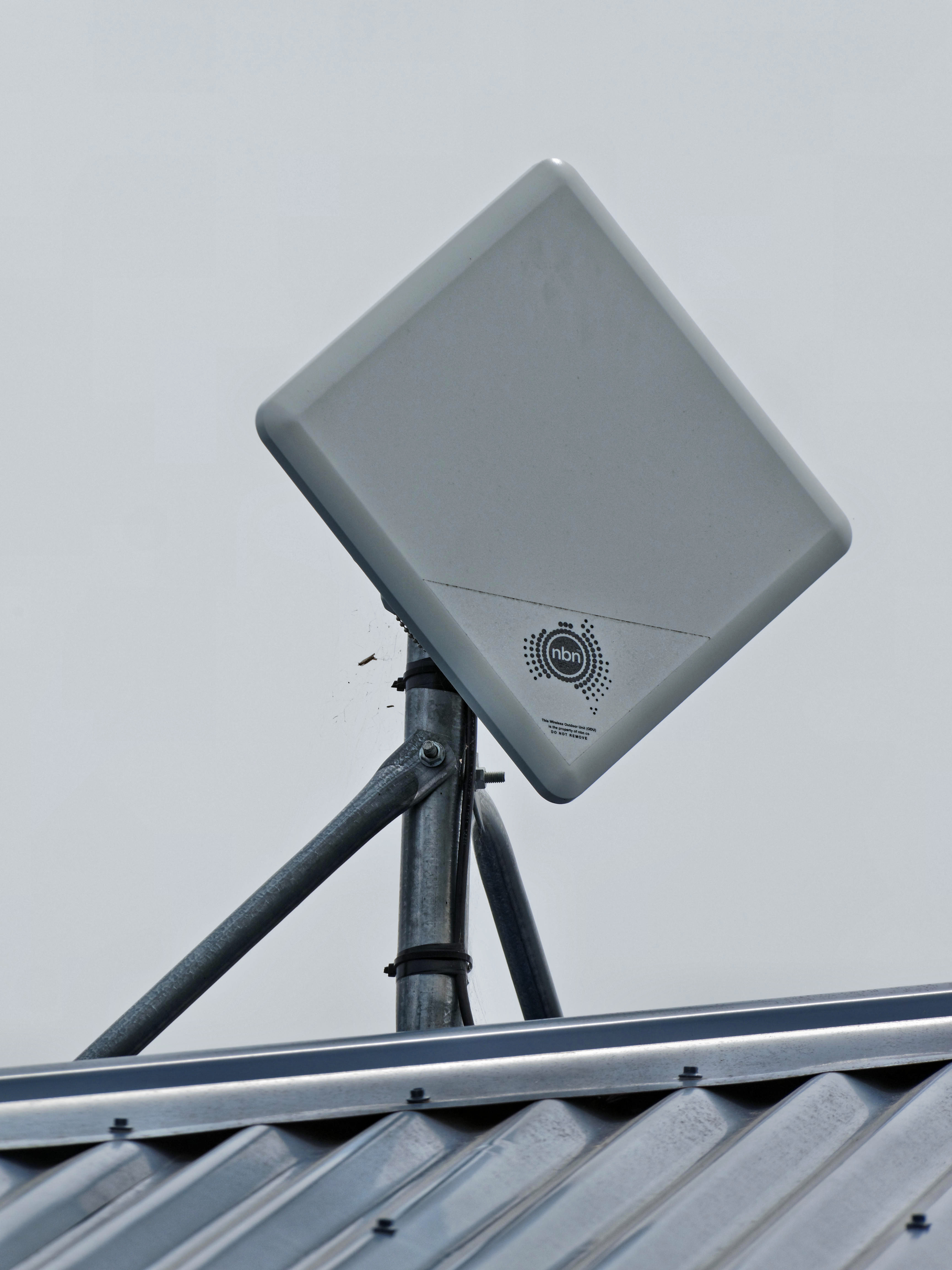
Fixed wireless outdoor unit (ODU) antenna (paired with the NTD)

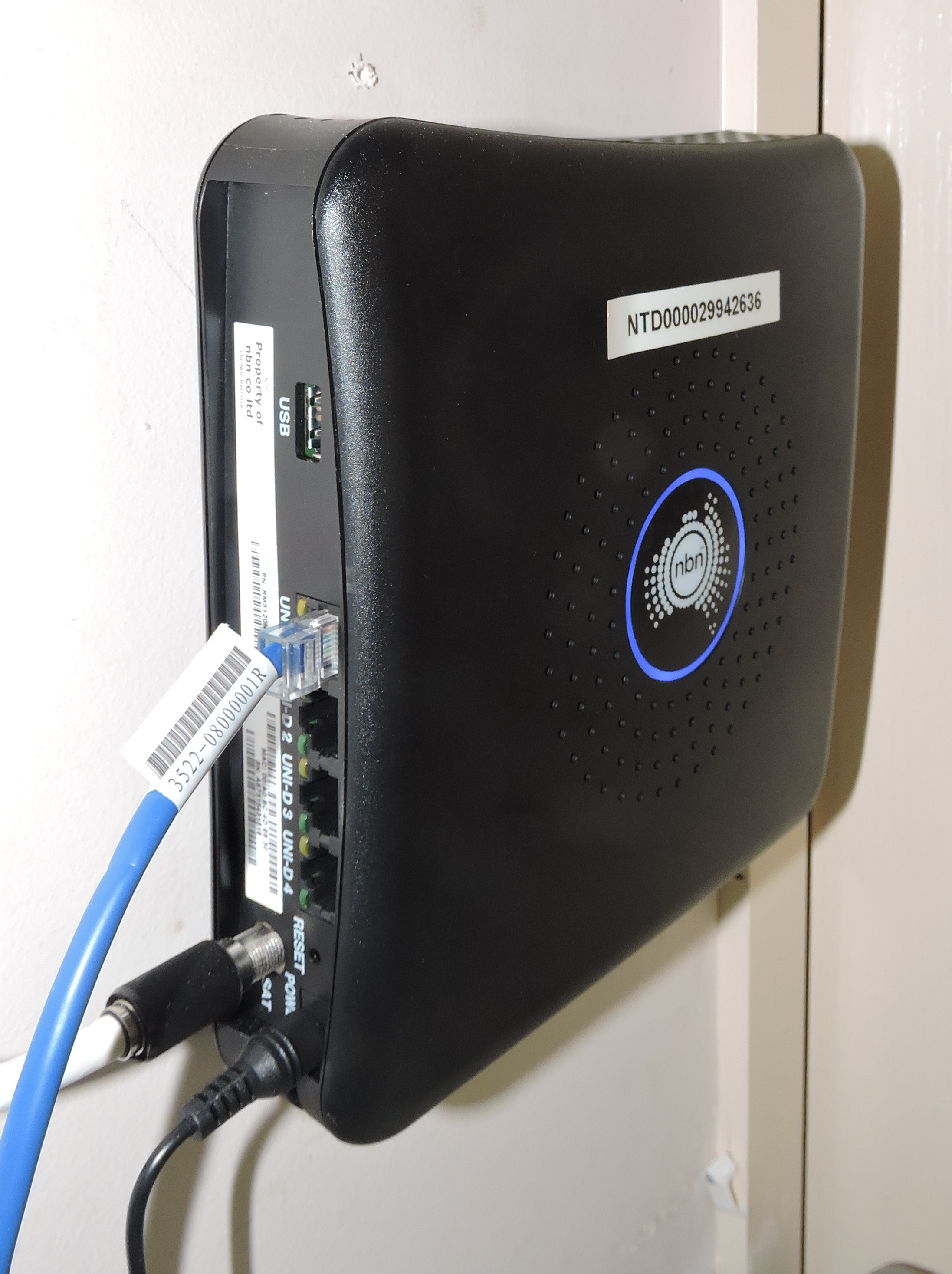
Satellite NTD

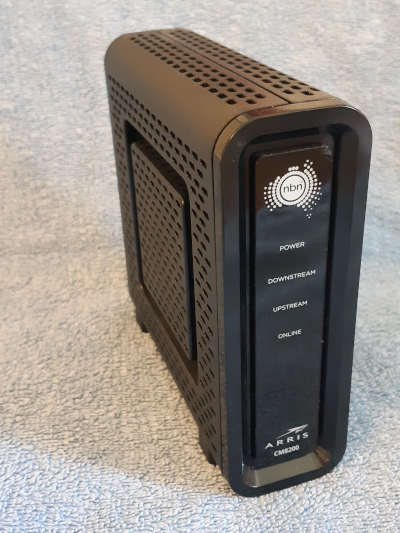
HFC Cable Modem (NTD)

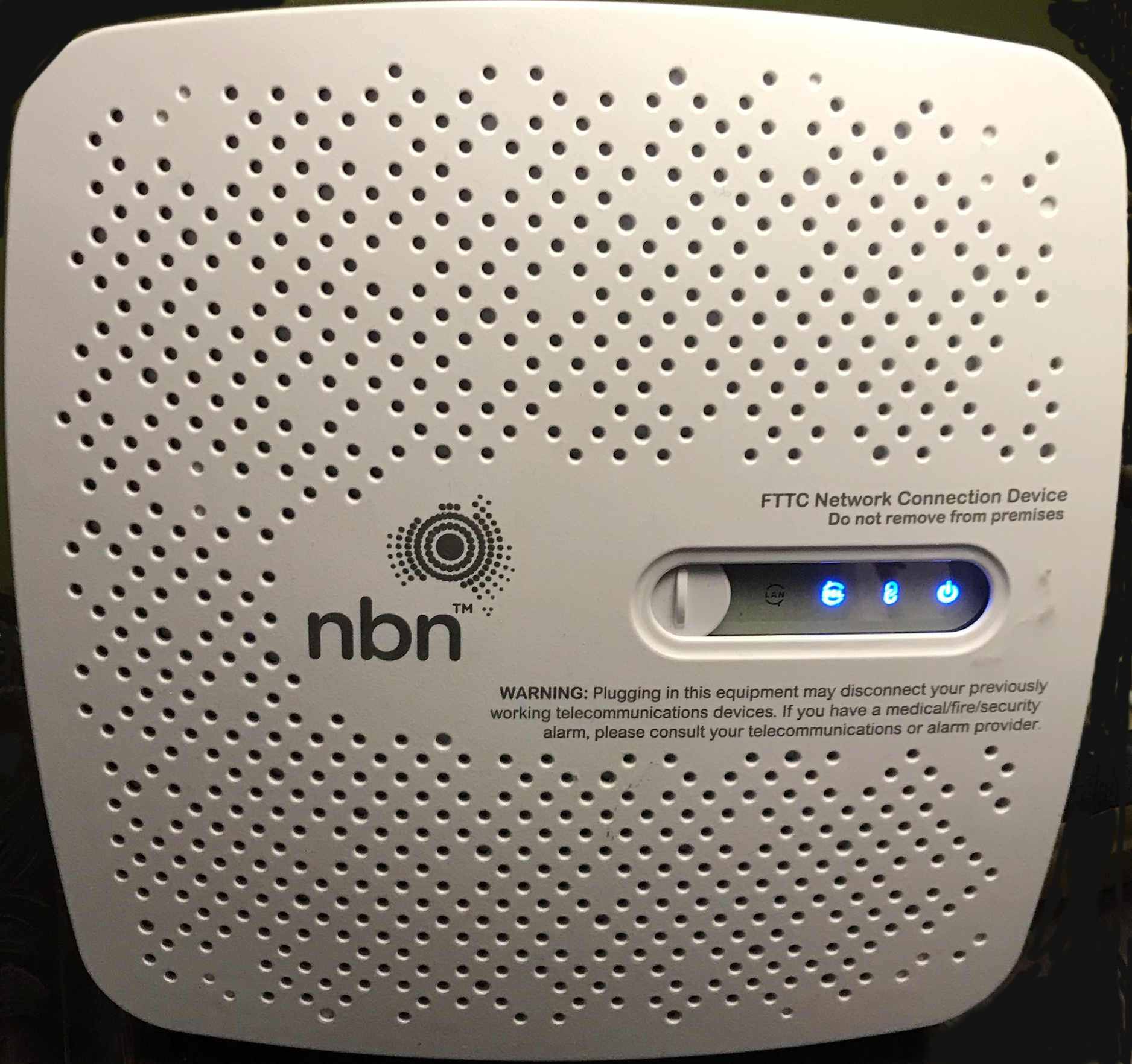
FTTC VDSL Modem (NCD)
