= IP Hard-pipe =

IP hard pipe, defined in IETF RFC 7625, is an IP network-based technology that provides bandwidth guarantee and low delay for services.

Conventional IP networks allow bandwidth reuse, but do not allow key services to exclusively use fixed bandwidth. IP hard pipe strictly isolates soft and hard pipes by reserving hardware so that soft and hard pipes do not affect each other. Even if traffic bursts occur in the soft pipe, they cannot preempt hard pipe bandwidth. IP hard pipe reserves bandwidth and ensures low delay for services, and therefore can be used to carry leased line services of high-value customers.

== Purpose ==
As carrier networks are evolving to IP, customers with strict bandwidth, delay, and security requirements prefer SDH(Synchronous Digital Hierarchy) networks. To retain these customers, carriers must maintain both IP and SDH networks, which incurs significant maintenance costs. Therefore, carriers expect to migrate their customer network to the IP network to reduce maintenance costs and facilitate user management.

IP hard pipe is an IP network-based end-to-end transmission technology that provides bandwidth guarantee and low delay through dedicated hardware and independent pipes, allowing IP networks to provide end-to-end transmission services with SDH service quality. IP hard pipe also provides service-specific SLA (service-level agreement) monitoring and granular OAM, ensuring smooth evolution of SDH networks to IP networks.

== Benefit ==
IP hard pipe applies to carriers' key services (such as leased line services of enterprises) and bearer networks for valued services of medium- and large-sized enterprises (such as production networks). IP hard pipe brings the following benefits:

• Reduces SDH network construction investments and costs for maintaining both SDH and IP networks. When SDH networks run out of warranty, new services can be rolled out on IP networks, and key services of high-value VIP customers can be deployed on newly established networks.

- Provides rapid service protection, ensuring highly reliable service.
- Provides granular service quality measurement, providing flexible and effective maintenance and management for leased lines dedicated to VIP customers.
- Applies to key services of transportation and electricity industries.

== Principle ==
Centralized Management of Bandwidth Resources and Uniform Service Provisioning In the IP hard pipe solution, the NMS centrally manages bandwidth resources and uniformly provisions services. Provisioning hard pipe service involves two steps:

1. Establish a hard pipe plane – in the physical network topology, establish the hard pipe topology as designed.
1. Provision services – the service bandwidth and source and destination devices are manually specified for VIP customers. The NMS then delivers configurations to the devices.

== Application ==
Hard-Pipe-based Enterprise Leased Line Application: carriers must plan the logical hard pipe network on existing IP bearer networks and reserve the hard pipe bandwidth on physical interfaces.

For example, if an enterprise user wants to establish a leased line between two sites over a carrier's network, the carrier first makes service plans and then performs uniform service deployment and provisioning based on the committed bandwidth. This helps establish a hard-pipe-based enterprise leased line.
