= Up0-interface =

Integrated services digital network interface used in private networks

For digital transmission, the U_{p0}-Interface is an integrated services digital network (ISDN) interface used in private networks. It is derived from the U_{K0}-Interface used in public networks.

In public networks, the maximum cable length of an U bus is between 4 and 8 km, and the maximum length of an S_{0}-bus is 900 meters for Point-to-Point configuration and about 150-300m for point-to-multipoint configurations. The U_{p0}-bus has, depending on cable quality, a reach of between 2 and 4 km, far more than the S_{0}-bus. This allows the use of ISDN telephone equipment in large private networks. Unlike the S_{0}-bus, the U_{p0}-bus runs at half duplex; that is, both sides alternate in sending and receiving.

While the S_{0}-bus allows for several ISDN device connections (up to 8), the U_{p0}-bus can connect only two devices, one at each end of the cable.

== See also ==
- U interface
