= BT Highway =

British Telecom Internet service

BT Highway was a UK retail ISDN2e service from British Telecom which was announced in November 1997 and withdrawn in February 2007. In the domestic market, it was sold as BT Home Highway and for small businesses, BT Business Highway. These names were used simply to differentiate billing schemes; the hardware for both services used the name BT Highway. Unlike regular ISDN2e service where only a digital S interface is provided BT Highway provided both digital and analogue connections simplifying migration from regular POTS service.

== Notability in the UK Internet timeline ==
Due to ISDN's ability to establish connections in less than 3 seconds, compared to 30–60 seconds for a dial-up modem, BT Highway provided many people's first experience of a near always-on Internet connection. The service also provided many people's first experience of an Internet connection that ran faster than a dial-up modem (up to 128 kbit/s compared to 56 kbit/s, and with a latency of 75-150 ms compared to 150-300 ms). BT Highway was available five or more years before the availability of broadband, especially in rural areas where ISDN was available over far longer distances, and far more telephone exchanges, than the initial roll-out of ADSL.

== Details ==
BT Highway was provided as a wall-mounted panel that supplemented an analogue master socket. A blank faceplate was placed across the analogue master socket so that all connections had to be performed through the panel.

BT Highway was distinctive because, unlike most ISDN services, it was aimed at both home and small-business users, and incorporated both analogue sockets (coloured white) and ISDN sockets (coloured blue). It was possible to plug in both Cat5 ISDN equipment and traditional POTS analogue telephones at the same time into the same master panel; normally, an ISDN master panel provides only ISDN sockets. As with a standard ISDN2e service, it was possible to mix and match concurrent connections to provide two concurrent analogue phone calls, one analogue phone call and one ISDN 64 kbit/s call, two 64 kbit/s ISDN calls or one 128 kbit/s ISDN call. The analogue sockets were standard UK BS6312 sockets and included a ring capacitor.

Unlike an analogue master socket, BT Highway required external power from a mains electric adaptor. However, in the event of a power cut, the system still allowed analogue telephone calls to be made through the first analogue socket.

Connection to the Internet was typically performed either by a dedicated ISDN router or by an ISDN PCI card. Later versions of BT Highway provided a USB port which PCs could connect to; a driver CD was supplied and the device was seen as an ISDN modem by Windows. As with ISDN2e, most brands of device typically allowed the user to automatically connect and drop the second ISDN channel to switch between 64 kbit/s and 128 kbit/s, depending on whether one channel was already being used (for example, for a simultaneous analogue telephone call).

Three phone numbers were provided as standard: two for the analogue ports and one for use by ISDN equipment. Home highway users were limited to these while business highway users could order Multiple Subscriber Numbering to get more phone numbers for ISDN equipment.

== Introduction and withdrawal ==
BT Highway was announced in November 1997 and introduced on an exchange-by-exchange basis starting in September 1998. BT stopped selling new services on 5 September 2005 and stopped providing BT Highway services altogether in February 2007, encouraging users to migrate to ADSL. Where migration to ADSL was not possible, BT continued to sell their ISDN2e service for business customers only.
