= R interface =

R interface or R reference point defines the point between a non-ISDN device and a terminal adapter (TA) which provides translation to and from such a device.

== See also ==
- S interface
- T interface
- U interface
