= Nortel Norstar =

Office telephone system

Norstar logo

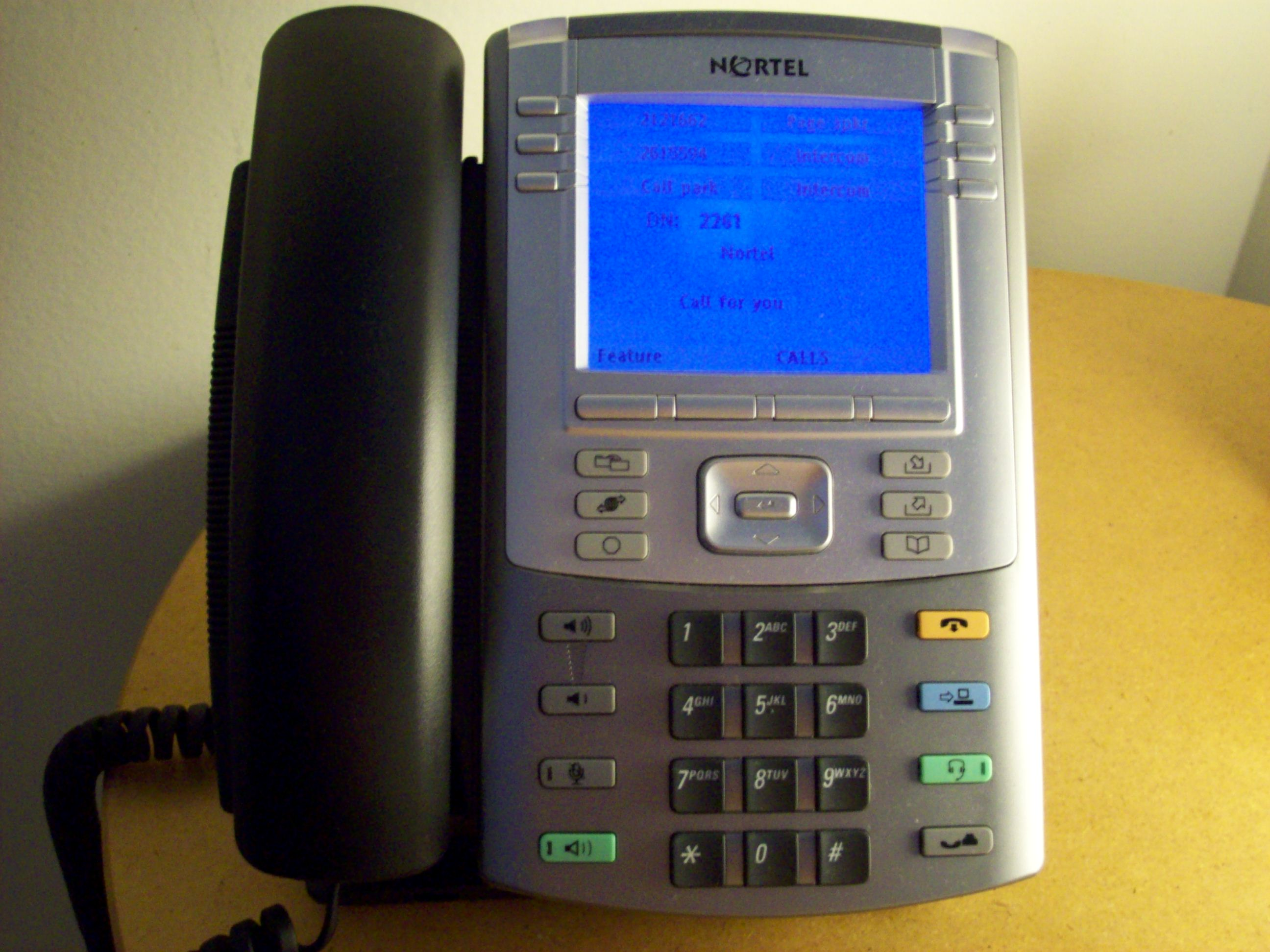
Current 1140E IP set for use on BCM and CS1000/2100 Nortel/Avaya systems

The Nortel Norstar, previously the Meridian Norstar, was a small and medium-sized business digital key telephone system introduced by Nortel (formerly Northern Telecom) and later sold to Avaya. It featured automatic call distribution, and supported up to 192 extensions. In the United Kingdom it was sold by British Telecom, rebadged as the BT Norstar.

== History ==
With the advent of LSI ICs, also called integrated circuits in the 1980s, key telephone system design went from electro-mechanical parts to electronic or fully digital parts. The first key system developed by Northern Telecom in the early 1980s was the Vantage TDD system. Unlike the success of the SL1 system, the Vantage system did not catch with the business environment and the Meridian Norstar was developed as its replacement.

In 1988, Nortel developed the Meridian Norstar system. This system directly competed with the AT&T Merlin, ROLM Redwood, Executone/Isotec Hybrid systems, Toshiba DK Strata, and NEC hybrid systems. Unlike the earlier Vantage system, the Norstar went on to be one of the leading telephone systems in the world. It is visible worldwide with installations at major retail chains, educational environments, medical institutions, government facilities, and many places where key telephone systems are required.

The Norstar system went further than the other systems in similarity to a PBX system such as the Meridian SL-1/Meridian 1 system developed in the late 1980s as well. This allowed blurring the distinction of key telephone system versus PBX telephone system. Many features such as Direct Inward Dial, Caller ID, Automatic Call Distribution, and Call Accounting were designed off the larger Meridian 1 PBX, DMS-100 and Meridian SL-100 as opposed to being developed as an independent system.

Although there were many hardware/design similarities between the Norstar systems and larger Meridian 1/Meridian SL-100 systems, the telephones themselves could not be used interchangeably between the key system and PBX. They were, however, backward compatible on their respective switch. That is, the oldest Meridian M7000 telephones can be used on the newest Business Communication Manager system. The latest T7000 series telephones can also be used on an older Norstar system such as the DR5.1. This allows companies to invest in hardware as needed.

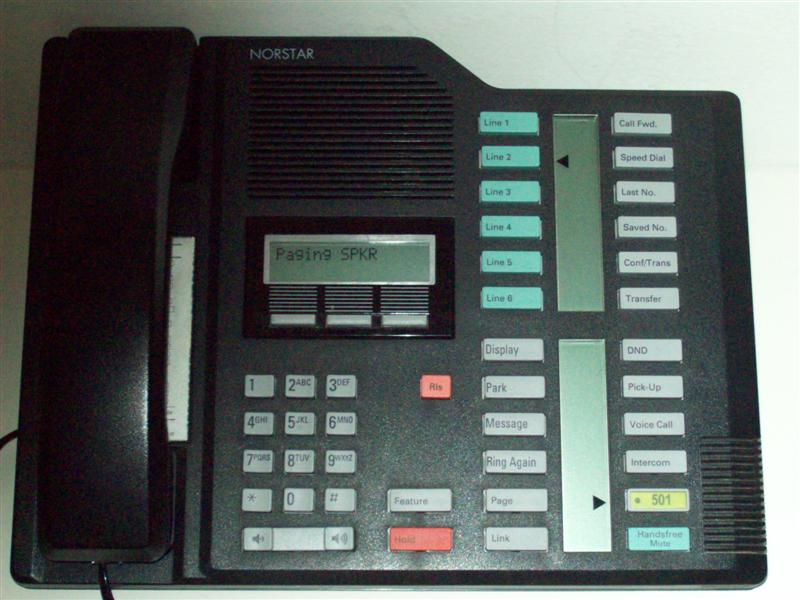
Northern Telecom Norstar M7324 switchboard telephone

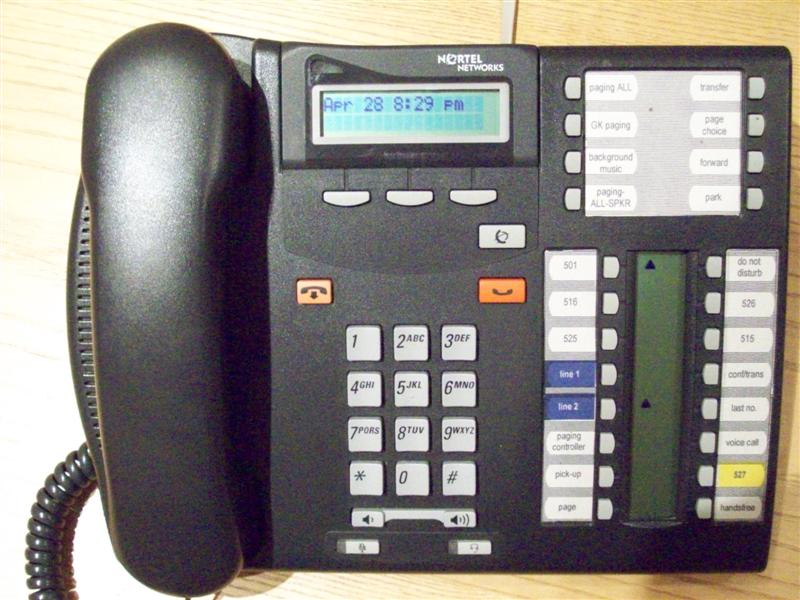
Nortel T7316 Telephone, compatible with newer BCM and older Norstar systems

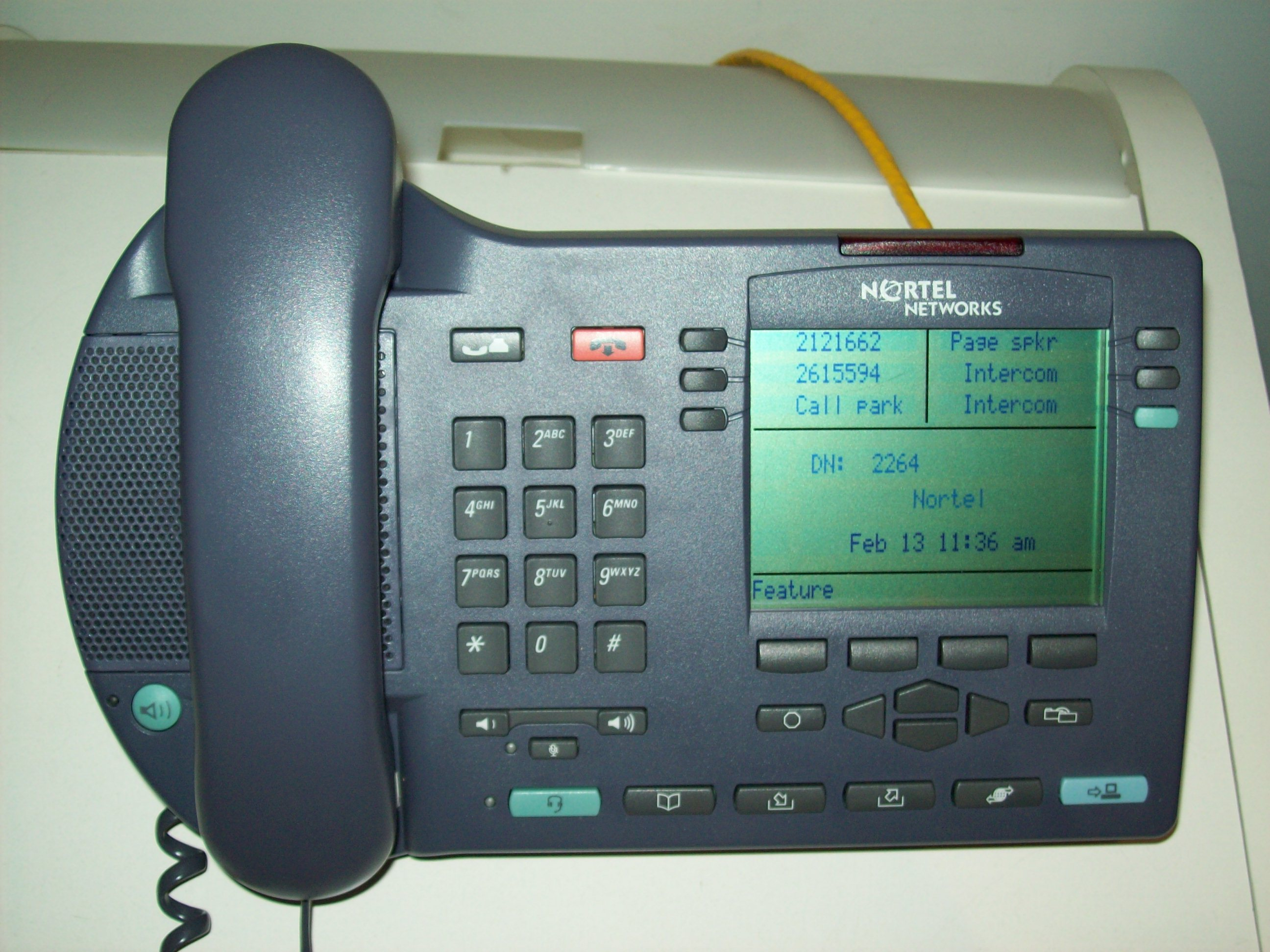
Model i2004 IP set that can be used on BCM and CS1000/2100 Nortel/Avaya systems

== Migration path ==
The Norstar system is no longer produced by Nortel and branded as the Nortel Norstar system. The recommended migration path from the Norstar to a full VOIP/SIP system is the Avaya IP Office, although it was previously the Nortel BCM (for Business Communication Manager). There were two systems available, the BCM50 for smaller enterprises with 3-30 extensions and the BCM450 which allows up to 300 sets. The BCM200, BCM400, and BCM1000 were older releases of this same platform. After Avaya's acquisition of Nortel's Enterprise Division, it announced that the Norstar and BCM systems would continue being manufactured, but under the Avaya name. Avaya rolled out cards that supported the Nortel sets on the IP Office platform. Nortel features and programming would be preserved, but would accompany Avaya features and programming as well.

== See also ==
- Business telephone system
- Telephone hook
