= U interface =

Basic Rate Interface

The U interface or U reference point is a Basic Rate Interface (BRI) in the local loop of an Integrated Services Digital Network (ISDN), connecting the network terminator (NT1/2) on the customer's premises to the line termination (LT) in the carrier's local exchange, in other words providing the connection from subscriber to central office.

Unlike the ISDN S/T interfaces, the U interface was not originally electrically defined by the ITU ISDN specifications, but left up to network operators to implement, although the ITU has issued recommendations G.960 and G.961 to formalize the standards adopted in the US and EU.

In the US, the U interface is originally defined by the ANSI T1.601 specification as a 2-wire connection using 2B1Q line coding. It is not as distance sensitive as the S interface or T interface, and can operate at distances up to 18,000 feet. Typically the U interface does not connect to terminal equipment (which typically has an S/T interface) but to an NT1 or NT2 (network terminator type 1 or 2.)

An NT1 is a discrete device that converts the U interface to an S/T interface, which is then connected to terminal equipment (TE) having an S/T interface. However, some TE devices integrate an NT1, and therefore have a direct U interface suitable for connection directly to the loop.

An NT2 is a more sophisticated local switching device such as a PBX, that may convert the signal to a different format or hand it off as S/T to terminal equipment.

In America, the NT1 is customer premises equipment (CPE) which is purchased and maintained by the user, which makes the U interface a User–network interface (UNI). The American variant is specified by ANSI T1.601.

In Europe, the NT1 belongs to the network operator, so the user doesn't have direct access to the U interface. The European variant is specified by the European Telecommunications Standards Institute (ETSI) in recommendation ETR 080. The ITU-T has issued recommendations G.960 and G.961 with world-wide scope, encompassing both the European and American variants of the U interface.

== Logical interface ==
Like all other ISDN basic rate interfaces, the U interface carries two B (bearer) channels at 64 kbit/s and one D (data) channel at 16 kbit/s for a combined bitrate of 144 kbit/s (2B+D).

== Duplex transmission ==
While in a four-wire interface such as the ISDN S and T-interfaces one wire pair is available for each direction of transmission, a two-wire interface needs to implement both directions on a single wire pair. To that end, ITU-T recommendation G.961 specifies two duplex transmission technologies for the ISDN U interface, either of which shall be used: Echo cancellation (ECH) and Time Compression Multiplex (TCM).

=== Echo cancellation (ECH) ===
When a transmitter applies a signal to the wire-pair, parts of the signal will be reflected as a result of imperfect balance of the hybrid and because of impedance discontinuities on the line. These reflections return to the transmitter as an echo and are indistinguishable from a signal transmitted at the far end. In the echo cancellation (ECH) scheme, the transmitter locally simulates the echo it expects to receive, and subtracts it from the received signal.

=== Time Compression Multiplex (TCM) ===
The Time Compression Multiplex (TCM) duplex method, also referred to as "burst mode", solves the echo problem indirectly. The line is operated at a rate at least twice the signal rate and both ends of the line take turns transmitting, in a time-division duplex fashion.

== Line Systems ==
ITU-T G.961 specifies four line systems for the ISDN U interface: MMS43, 2B1Q, TCM, and SU32. All line systems except TCM use echo cancellation for duplex operation. The American standard ANSI T1.601 specifies the 2B1Q line system, the European ETSI TR 080 recommendation specifies 2B1Q and MMS43.

=== MMMS43 (4B3T) ===
The Modified Monitoring State Code mapping 4 bits into 3 ternary symbols (MMS43), which is also referred to as 4B3T (four binary, three ternary) is a line system used in Europe and elsewhere in the world. 4B3T is a "block code" that uses Return-to-Zero states on the line. 4B3T converts each group of 4 data bits into 3 "ternary" line signal states (3 symbols). Echo cancellation techniques allow full-duplex operation on the line.

MMS43 is defined in Appendix I of G.961, Annex B of ETR 080, and other national standards, like Germany's 1TR220. 4B3T can be transmitted reliably at up to 4.2 km over 0.4 mm cable or up to 8.2 km over 0.6 mm cable. An internal termination impedance of 150ohms is presented to the line at each end of the U-interface.

A 1 ms frame carrying 144 bits of 2B+D data is mapped to 108 ternary symbols. These symbols are scrambled, with different scrambling codes for the two transmission directions, in order reduce correlation between transmitted and received signal. To this frame, an 11-symbol preamble and a symbol from the C_{L} channel are added, yielding a frame size of 120 ternary symbols and a symbol rate of 120 kilobaud. The C_{L} channel is used to request activation or deactivation of a loopback in either the NT1 or a line regenerator.

In 4B3T coding, there are three states presented to line: a positive pulse (+), a negative pulse (-), or a zero-state (no pulse: 0). An analogy here is that operation is similar to B8ZS or HDB3 in T1/E1 systems, except that there is an actual gain in the information rate by coding 2^{4}=16 possible binary states to one of 3^{3}=27 ternary states. This added redundancy is used to generate a zero DC-bias signal.

One requirement for line transmission is that there should be no DC build-up on the line, so the accumulated DC build-up is monitored and the codewords are chosen accordingly. Of the 16 binary information words, some are always mapped to a DC-component free (ternary) code word, while others can be mapped to either one of two code words, one with a positive and the other with a negative DC-component. In the latter case, the transmitter chooses whether to send the code-word with negative or positive DC-component based on the accumulated DC-offset.

=== 2B1Q ===
2B1Q coding is the standard used in North America, Italy, and Switzerland. 2B1Q means that two bits are combined to form a single Quaternary line state (symbol). 2B1Q combines two bits at a time to be represented by one of four signal levels on the line. Echo cancellation techniques allow full-duplex operation on the line.

2B1Q coding is defined in Appendix II of G.961, ANSI T1.601, and Annex A of ETR 080. It can operate at distances up to about 18,000 feet (5.5 km) with loss up to 42dB. An internal termination impedance of 135 ohms is presented to the line at each end of the U-interface.

A 1.5 ms frame carrying 216 scrambled bits of 2B+D data is mapped to 108 quaternary symbols. To this frame, a 9-symbol preamble and 3 symbols from the C_{L} channel are added, yielding a frame size of 120 quaternary symbols and a symbol rate of 80 kilobaud. The C_{L} channel is used for communication between LT and NT1, a 12-bit cyclic redundancy check (CRC), and various other physical layer functions. The CRC covers one 12 ms multiframe (8×1.5 ms frames).

=== TCM / AMI ===
The TCM / AMI ISDN line system, also referred to as TCM-ISDN, is used by Nippon Telegraph and Telephone in its "INS-Net 64" service.

Appendix III of G.961 specifies a line system based on the Time Compression Multiplex (TCM) duplex method and an alternate mark inversion (AMI) line code. The AMI line code maps one input bit to one ternary symbol. Like with MMS43, the ternary symbol can either be a positive (+), zero (0), or negative (-) voltage. A 0 bit is represented by a zero voltage, while a 1 bit is alternatingly represented by a positive and a negative voltage, resulting in a DC-bias free signal. In a 2.5 ms interval, each side can send a 1.178 ms frame representing 360 bits of 2B+D data. To the 2B+D data, an 8-bit preamble, 8 bits from the C_{L} channel, as well as a parity bit are added, yielding a frame size of 377 bits and a baud rate of 320 kilobaud. The C_{L} channel is used for operations and maintenance, as well transmitting a 12-bit CRC covering 4 frames.

=== SU32 ===
Appendix IV of G.961 specifies a line system based on echo cancellation and a substitutional 3B2T (SU32) line code, which maps three bits into 2 ternary symbols. As with MMS43 and AMI, the ternary symbol can either be a positive (+), zero (0), or negative (-) voltage. The mapping from 2^{3}=8 to 3^{2}=9 symbols leaves one unused symbol. When two subsequent input (binary) information words are identical, the (ternary) code word is substituted by the unused code word. A 0.75 ms frame carrying 108 bits of 2B+D data is mapped to 72 ternary symbols. To this frame, a 6-symbol preamble, one CRC symbol, and 2 symbols from the C_{L} channel are added, yielding a frame size of 81 ternary symbols and a symbol rate of 108 kilobaud. The C_{L} channel is used for supervisory and maintenance functions between the LT and NT1. The 15-bit CRC covers 16 frames.

== See also ==
- ISDN
- R interface
- S interface
- T interface
- U_{p0}-interface
