= Network termination 1 =

Network Termination 1 (NT1) or Network Termination type 1 refers to equipment in an Integrated Services Digital Network (ISDN) that physically and electrically terminates the network at the customer's premises. The NT1 network termination provides signal conversion and timing functions which correspond to layer 1 of the OSI model. In a Basic Rate Interface, the NT1 connects to line termination (LT) equipment in the provider's telephone exchange via the local loop two wire U interface and to customer equipment via the four wire S interface or T interface. The S and T interfaces are electrically equivalent, and the customer equipment port of a NT1 is often labelled as S/T interface. There are many types of NT1 available.

In the United States, the NT1 is considered customer-premises equipment (CPE) and is as such generally provided by the customer or integrated into the customer's equipment. In this case, the U interface is the termination point of the ISDN network. In Europe, the NT1 is generally provided by the provider, and the S/T is the termination point of the ISDN network.
