= CSU/DSU =

Digital interface device

A CSU/DSU (channel service unit/data service unit) is a digital-interface device used to connect data terminal equipment (DTE), such as a router, to a digital circuit, such as a Digital Signal 1 (DS1) T1 line. The CSU/DSU implements two different functions. The channel service unit (CSU) is responsible for the connection to the telecommunication network, while the data service unit (DSU) is responsible for managing the interface with the DTE. A CSU/DSU can have an external connection point or it can be integrated into a modular card installed in a router.

A CSU/DSU is the equivalent of the modem for an entire LAN. The DCE, commonly a modem or CSU/DSU, is the device used to convert the user data from the DTE into a form acceptable to the WAN service provider transmission link.

== WAN interface ==
The WAN Interface Card (WIC) may contain an integrated CSU/DSU that can be inserted into a router slot. An example of a WIC is the 1-port 56/64-kbit/s DSU/CSU WIC (WIC-1DSU-56K4) by Cisco Systems. DTE is generally a router, but can also be a terminal, computer, printer, or fax machine if they connect directly to the service provider network.
