= ISDN =

Set of digital telephony standards

- Integrated Services Digital Network
- Year started: 1980; 46 years ago
- First published: 1988; 38 years ago (Note: There is not a single ISDN specification, more a collection of various incompatible dialects.)
- Organization: ITU-T
- Predecessor: Plain old telephone service with dial-up Internet access
- Successor: Broadband such as DSL or FTTx

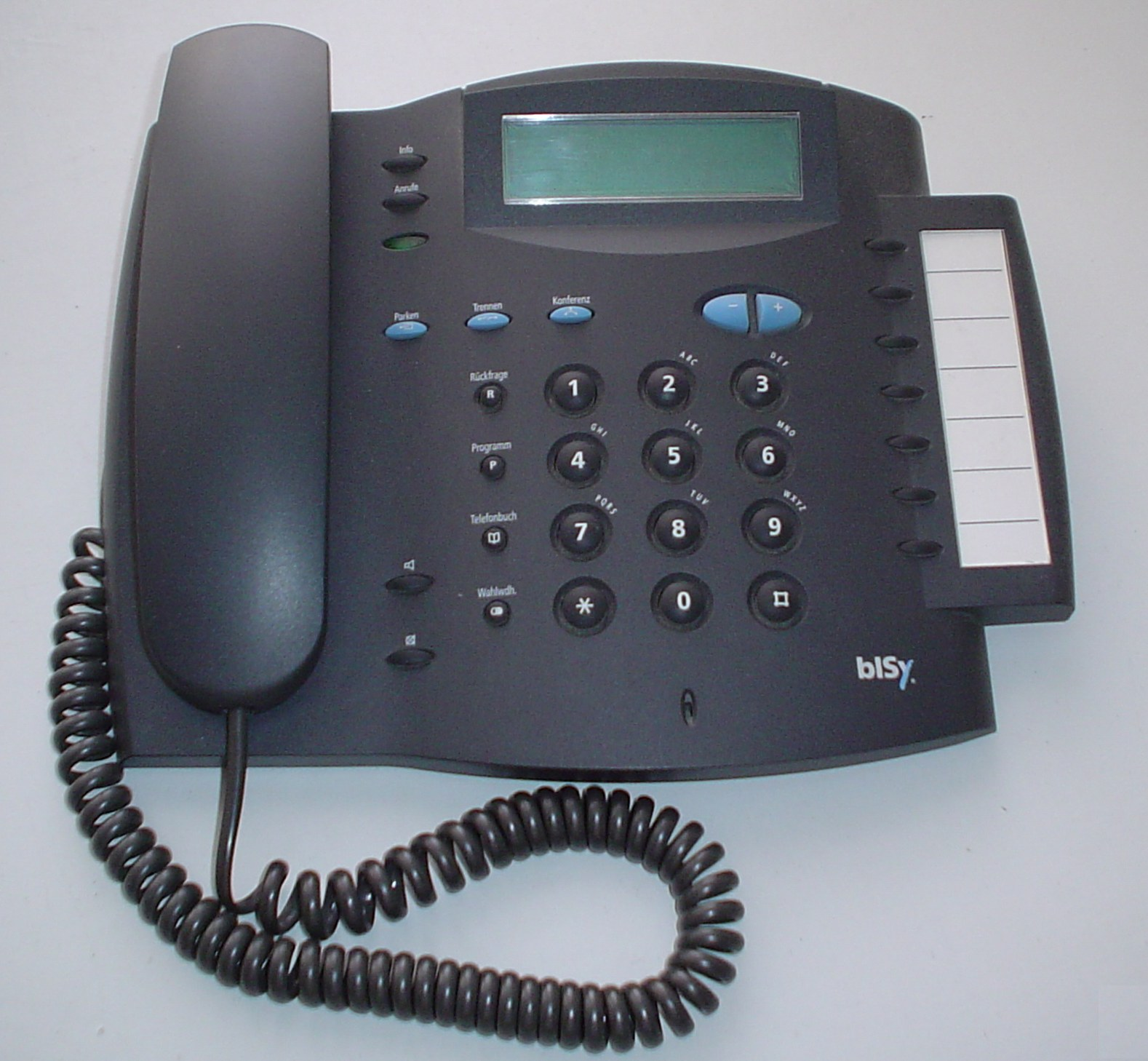
ISDN telephone

Integrated Services Digital Network (ISDN) is a set of communication standards for simultaneous digital transmission of voice, video, data, and other network services over the digitalised circuits of the public switched telephone network. Work on the standard began in 1980 at Bell Labs and was formally standardized in 1988 in the CCITT "Red Book". By the time the standard was released, newer networking systems with much greater speeds were available, and ISDN saw relatively little uptake in the wider market. One estimate suggests ISDN use peaked at a worldwide total of 25 million subscribers at a time when 1.3 billion analog lines were in use. ISDN has largely been replaced with digital subscriber line (DSL) systems of much higher performance.

Prior to ISDN, the telephone system consisted of digital links like T1/E1 on the long-distance lines between telephone company offices and analog signals on copper telephone wires to the customers, the "last mile". At the time, the network was viewed as a way to transport voice, with some special services available for data using additional equipment like modems or by providing a T1 on the customer's location. What became ISDN started as an effort to digitize the last mile, originally under the name "Public Switched Digital Capacity" (PSDC). This would allow call routing to be completed in an all-digital system, while also offering a separate data line. The Basic Rate Interface, or BRI, is the standard last-mile connection in the ISDN system, offering two 64 kbit/s "bearer" lines and a single 16 kbit/s "data" channel for commands and data.

ISDN remains successful globally, but in the US the system was largely ignored and garnered the industry nickname "innovation(s) subscribers didn't need." The underlying ISDN concepts found wider use as a replacement for the T1/E1 lines it was originally intended to extend, roughly doubling the performance of those lines.

== History ==
=== Digital lines ===
Since its introduction in 1881, the twisted pair copper line has been installed for telephone use worldwide, with well over a billion individual connections installed by the year 2000. Over the first half of the 20th century, the connection of these lines to form calls was increasingly automated, culminating in the crossbar switches that had largely replaced earlier concepts by the 1950s.

As telephone use surged in the post-WWII era, the problem of connecting the massive number of lines became an area of significant study. Bell Labs' seminal work on digital encoding of voice led to the use of 64 kbit/s as a standard for voice lines (or 56 kbit/s in some systems). In 1962, Robert Aaron of Bell introduced the T1 system, which carried 1.544 Mbit/s of data on a pair of twisted pair lines over a distance of about one mile. This was used in the Bell network to carry traffic between local switch offices, with 24 voice lines at 64 kbit/s and a separate 8 kbit/s line for signaling commands like connecting or hanging up a call. This could be extended over long distances using repeaters in the lines. T1 used a very simple encoding scheme, alternate mark inversion (AMI), which reached only a few percent of the theoretical capacity of the line but was appropriate for 1960s electronics.

By the late 1970s, T1 lines and their faster counterparts, along with all-digital switching systems, had replaced the earlier analog systems for most of the western world, leaving only the customer's equipment and their local end office using analog systems. Digitizing this "last mile" was increasingly seen as the next problem that needed to be solved. However, these connections now represented over 99% of the total telephony network, as the upstream links had increasingly been aggregated into a smaller number of much higher performance systems, especially after the introduction of fiber optic lines. If the system was to become all-digital, a new standard would be needed that was appropriate for the existing customer lines, which might be miles long and of widely varying quality.

=== Standardization ===
Around 1978, Ralph Wyndrum, Barry Bossick and Joe Lechleider of Bell Labs began one such effort to develop a last-mile solution. They studied a number of derivatives of the T1's AMI concept and concluded that a customer-side line could reliably carry about 160 kbit/s of data over a distance of 4 to 5 miles (6.4 to 8.0 km). That would be enough to carry two voice-quality lines at 64 kbit/s as well as a separate 16 kbit/s line for data. At the time, modems that were normally 300 bit/s and 1200 bit/s would not become common until the early 1980s and the 2400 bit/s standard would not be completed until 1984. In this market, 16 kbit/s represented a significant advance in performance in addition to being a separate channel that coexists with voice channels.

A key problem was that the customer might only have a single twisted pair line to the location of the handset, so the solution used in T1 with separate upstream and downstream connections was not universally available. With analog connections, the solution was to use echo cancellation, but at the much higher bandwidth of the new concept, this would not be so simple. A debate broke out between teams worldwide about the best solution to this problem; some promoted newer versions of echo cancellation, while others preferred the "ping pong" concept where the direction of data would rapidly switch the line from send to receive at such a high rate it would not be noticeable to the user. John Cioffi had recently demonstrated echo cancellation would work at these speeds, and further suggested that they should consider moving directly to 1.5 Mbit/s performance using this concept. The suggestion was literally laughed off the table and his boss told him to "sit down and shut up." But the echo cancellation concept that was taken up by Joe Lechleider eventually came to win the debate.

Meanwhile, the debate over the encoding scheme itself was also ongoing. As the new standard was to be international, this was even more contentious as several regional digital standards had emerged in the 1960s and 70s and merging them was not going to be easy. To further confuse issues, in 1984 the Bell System was broken up and the US center for development moved to the American National Standards Institute (ANSI) T1D1.3 committee. Thomas Starr of the newly formed Ameritech led this effort and eventually convinced the ANSI group to select the 2B1Q standard proposed by Peter Adams of British Telecom. This standard used an 80 kHz base frequency and encoded two bits per baud to produce the 160 kbit/s base rate. Ultimately Japan selected a different standard, and Germany selected one with three levels instead of four, but all of these could interchange with the ANSI standard.

From an economic perspective, the European Commission sought to liberalize and regulate ISDN across the European Economic Community. The Council of the European Communities adopted Council Recommendation in December 1986 for its coordinated introduction within the framework of CEPT. ETSI (the European Telecommunications Standards Institute) was created by CEPT in 1988 and would develop the framework.

=== Rollout ===
With digital-quality voice made possible by ISDN, offering two separate lines and continuous data connectivity, there was an initial global expectation of high customer demand for such systems in both the home and office environments. This expectation was met with varying degrees of success across different regions.

In the United States, many changes in the market led to the introduction of ISDN being tepid. During the lengthy standardization process, new concepts rendered the system largely superfluous. In the office, multi-line digital switches like the Meridian Norstar took over telephone lines while local area networks like Ethernet provided performance around 10 Mbit/s which had become the baseline for inter-computer connections in offices. ISDN offered no real advantages in the voice role and was far from competitive in data. Additionally, modems had continued improving, introducing 9600 bit/s systems in the late 1980s and 14.4 kbit/s in 1991, which significantly eroded ISDN's value proposition for the home customer.

Conversely, in Europe, ISDN found fertile ground for deployment, driven by regulatory support, infrastructural needs, and the absence of comparable high-speed communication technologies at the time. The technology was widely embraced for its ability to digitalize the "last mile" of telecommunications, significantly enhancing the quality and efficiency of voice, data, and video transmission over traditional analog systems.

Meanwhile, Lechleider had proposed using ISDN's echo cancellation and 2B1Q encoding on existing T1 connections so that the distance between repeaters could be doubled to about 2 miles (3.2 km). Another standards war broke out, but in 1991 Lechleider's 1.6 Mbit/s "High-Speed Digital Subscriber Line" eventually won this process as well, after Starr drove it through the ANSI T1E1.4 group. A similar standard emerged in Europe to replace their E1 lines, increasing the sampling range from 80 to 100 kHz to achieve 2.048 Mbit/s. By the mid-1990s, these Primary Rate Interface (PRI) lines had largely replaced T1 and E1 between telephone company offices.

=== Replacement by ADSL ===
Lechleider also believed this higher-speed standard would be much more attractive to customers than ISDN had proven. Unfortunately, at these speeds, the systems suffered from a type of crosstalk known as "NEXT", for "near-end crosstalk". This made longer connections on customer lines difficult. Lechleider noted that NEXT only occurred when similar frequencies were being used, and could be diminished if one of the directions used a different carrier rate, but doing so would reduce the potential bandwidth of that channel. Lechleider suggested that most consumer use would be asymmetric anyway, and that providing a high-speed channel towards the user and a lower speed return would be suitable for many uses.

This work in the early 1990s eventually led to the ADSL concept, which emerged in 1995. An early supporter of the concept was Alcatel, who jumped on ADSL while many other companies were still devoted to ISDN. Krish Prabu, COO of Alcatel, stated that "Alcatel will have to invest one billion dollars in ADSL before it makes a profit, but it is worth it." They introduced the first DSL Access Multiplexers (DSLAM), the large multi-modem systems used at the telephony offices, and later introduced customer ADSL modems under the Thomson brand. Alcatel remained the primary vendor of ADSL systems for well over a decade.

ADSL quickly replaced ISDN as the customer-facing solution for last-mile connectivity. ISDN has largely disappeared on the customer side, remaining in use only in niche roles like dedicated teleconferencing systems and similar legacy systems. In 2026, the ISDN subsystem within the Linux kernel was retired and removed.

== Design ==
Integrated services refers to ISDN's ability to deliver at minimum two simultaneous connections, in any combination of data, voice, video, and fax, over a single line. Multiple devices can be attached to the line, and used as needed. That means an ISDN line can take care of what were expected to be most people's complete communications needs (apart from broadband Internet access and entertainment television) at a much higher transmission rate, without forcing the purchase of multiple analog phone lines. It also refers to integrated switching and transmission in that telephone switching and carrier wave transmission are integrated rather than separate as in earlier technology.

=== Configurations ===
In ISDN, there are two types of channels, B (for "bearer") and D (for "data"). B channels are used for data (which may include voice), and D channels are intended for signaling and control (but can also be used for data).

There are two ISDN implementations. Basic Rate Interface (BRI), also called basic rate access (BRA) — consists of two B channels, each with bandwidth of 64 kbit/s, and one D channel with a bandwidth of 16 kbit/s. Together these three channels can be designated as 2B+D. Primary Rate Interface (PRI), also called primary rate access (PRA) in Europe — contains a greater number of B channels and a D channel with a bandwidth of 64 kbit/s. The number of B channels for PRI varies according to the nation: in North America and Japan it is 23B+1D, with an aggregate bit rate of 1.544 Mbit/s (T1); in Europe, India and Australia it is 30B+2D, with an aggregate bit rate of 2.048 Mbit/s (E1). Broadband Integrated Services Digital Network (BISDN) is another ISDN implementation and it is able to manage different types of services at the same time. It is primarily used within network backbones and employs ATM.

Another alternative ISDN configuration can be used in which the B channels of an ISDN BRI line are bonded to provide a total duplex bandwidth of 128 kbit/s. This precludes use of the line for voice calls while the internet connection is in use. The B channels of several BRIs can be bonded, a typical use is a 384K videoconferencing channel.

Using bipolar with eight-zero substitution encoding technique, call data is transmitted over the data (B) channels, with the signaling (D) channels used for call setup and management. Once a call is set up, there is a simple 64 kbit/s synchronous bidirectional data channel (actually implemented as two simplex channels, one in each direction) between the end parties, lasting until the call is terminated. There can be as many calls as there are bearer channels, to the same or different end-points. Bearer channels may also be multiplexed into what may be considered single, higher-bandwidth channels via a process called B channel BONDING, or via use of Multi-Link PPP "bundling" or by using an H0, H11, or H12 channel on a PRI.

The D channel can also be used for sending and receiving X.25 data packets, and connection to X.25 packet network, this is specified in X.31. In practice, X.31 was only commercially implemented in the UK, France, Japan and Germany.

=== Reference points ===
A set of reference points are defined in the ISDN standard to refer to certain points between the telco and the end-user equipment.

- R – defines the point between non-ISDN terminal equipment, terminal equipment 2 (TE2), and a terminal adapter (TA) which provides translation to and from such a device
- S – defines the point between ISDN terminal equipment, terminal equipment 1 (TE1), or a TA and a Network Termination Type 2 (NT2) device
- T – defines the point between the NT2 and network termination 1 (NT1) devices.

Most NT-1 devices can perform the functions of the NT2 as well, and so the S and T reference points are generally collapsed into the S/T reference point.

In North America, the NT1 device is considered customer premises equipment (CPE) and must be maintained by the customer, thus, the U interface is provided to the customer. In other locations, the NT1 device is maintained by the telco, and the S/T interface is provided to the customer. In India, service providers provide U interface and an NT1 may be supplied by Service provider as part of service offering.

=== Basic Rate Interface ===
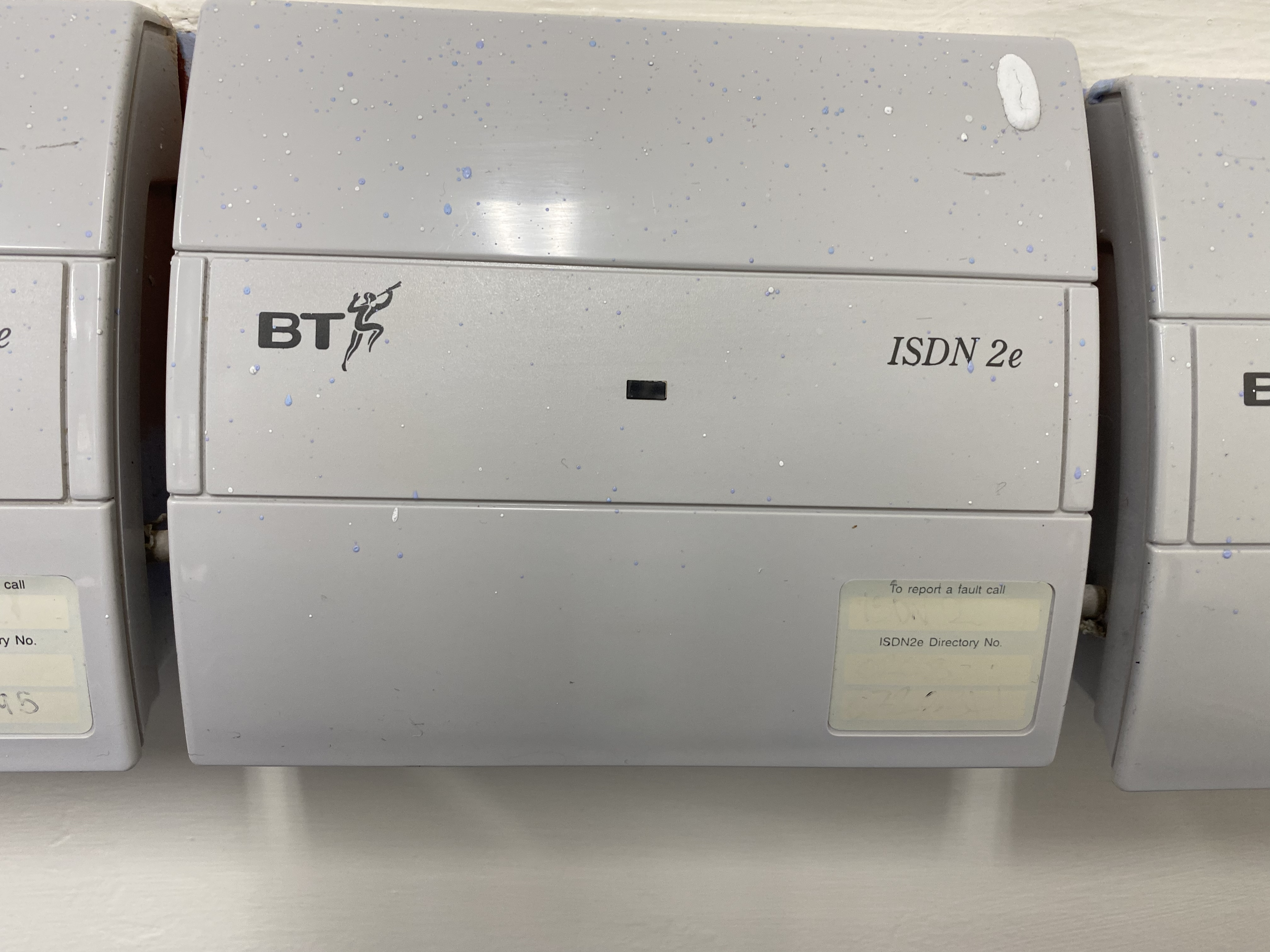
A decommissioned BT ISDN 2e box

The entry level interface to ISDN is the Basic Rate Interface (BRI), a 128 kbit/s service delivered over a pair of standard telephone copper wires. The 144 kbit/s overall payload rate is divided into two 64 kbit/s bearer channels ('B' channels) and one 16 kbit/s signaling channel ('D' channel or data channel). This is sometimes referred to as 2B+D.

The interface specifies the following network interfaces:

- The U interface is a two-wire interface between the exchange and a network terminating unit, which is usually the demarcation point in non-North American networks.
- The T interface is a serial interface between a computing device and a terminal adapter, which is the digital equivalent of a modem.
- The S interface is a four-wire bus that ISDN consumer devices plug into; the S & T reference points are commonly implemented as a single interface labeled 'S/T' on a Network termination 1 (NT1).
- The R interface defines the point between a non-ISDN device and a terminal adapter (TA) which provides translation to and from such a device.

BRI-ISDN is very popular in Europe but is much less common in North America. It is also common in Japan — where it is known as INS64.

=== Primary Rate Interface ===
The other ISDN access available is the Primary Rate Interface (PRI), which is carried over T-carrier (T1) with 24 time slots (channels) in North America, and over E-carrier (E1) with 32 channels in most other countries. Each channel provides transmission at a 64 kbit/s data rate.

With the E1 carrier, the available channels are divided into 30 bearer (B) channels, one data (D) channel, and one timing and alarm channel. This scheme is often referred to as 30B+2D.

In North America, PRI service is delivered via T1 carriers with only one data channel, often referred to as 23B+D, and a total data rate of 1544 kbit/s. Non-Facility Associated Signalling (NFAS) allows two or more PRI circuits to be controlled by a single D channel, which is sometimes called 23B+D + n*24B. D-channel backup allows for a second D channel in case the primary fails. NFAS is commonly used on a Digital Signal 3 (DS3/T3).

PRI-ISDN is popular throughout the world, especially for connecting private branch exchanges to the public switched telephone network (PSTN).

Even though many network professionals use the term ISDN to refer to the lower-bandwidth BRI circuit, in North America BRI is relatively uncommon whilst PRI circuits serving PBXs are commonplace.

=== Bearer channel ===
The bearer channel (B) is a standard 64 kbit/s voice channel of 8 bits sampled at 8 kHz with G.711 encoding. B-channels can also be used to carry data, since they are nothing more than digital channels.

Each one of these channels is known as a DS0.

Most B channels can carry a 64 kbit/s signal, but some were limited to 56K because they traveled over RBS lines. This was commonplace in the 20th century, but has since become less so.

=== X.25 ===
X.25 can be carried over the B or D channels of a BRI line, and over the B channels of a PRI line. X.25 over the D channel is used at many point-of-sale (credit card) terminals because it eliminates the modem setup, and because it connects to the central system over a B channel, thereby eliminating the need for modems and making much better use of the central system's telephone lines.

X.25 was also part of an ISDN protocol called "Always On/Dynamic ISDN", or AO/DI. This allowed a user to have a constant multi-link PPP connection to the internet over X.25 on the D channel, and brought up one or two B channels as needed.

=== Frame Relay ===
In theory, Frame Relay can operate over the D channel of BRIs and PRIs, but it is seldom, if ever, used.

== Uses ==
=== Telephone industry ===
ISDN is a core technology in the telephone industry. A telephone network can be thought of as a collection of wires strung between switching systems. The common electrical specification for the signals on these wires is T1 or E1. Between telephone company switches, the signaling is performed via SS7. Normally, a PBX is connected via a T1 with robbed-bit signaling to indicate on-hook or off-hook conditions and MF and DTMF tones to encode the destination number. ISDN is much better because messages can be sent much more quickly than by trying to encode numbers as long (100 ms per digit) tone sequences. This results in faster call setup times. Also, a greater number of features are available and fraud is reduced.

In common use, ISDN is often limited to usage to Q.931 and related protocols, which are a set of signaling protocols establishing and breaking circuit-switched connections, and for advanced calling features for the user. Another usage was the deployment of videoconference systems, where a direct end-to-end connection is desirable. ISDN uses the H.320 standard for audio coding and video coding.

ISDN is also used as a smart-network technology intended to add new services to the public switched telephone network (PSTN) by giving users direct access to end-to-end circuit-switched digital services and as a backup or failsafe circuit solution for critical use data circuits.

=== Video conferencing ===
One of ISDNs successful use-cases was in the videoconference field, where even small improvements in data rates are useful, but more importantly, its direct end-to-end connection offers lower latency and better reliability than packet-switched networks of the 1990s. The H.320 standard for audio coding and video coding was designed with ISDN in mind, and more specifically its 64 kbit/s basic data rate. including audio codecs such as G.711 (PCM) and G.728 (CELP), and discrete cosine transform (DCT) video codecs such as H.261 and H.263.

=== Broadcast industry ===
ISDN is used heavily by the broadcast industry as a reliable way of switching low-latency, high-quality, long-distance audio circuits. In conjunction with an appropriate codec using MPEG or various manufacturers' proprietary algorithms, an ISDN BRI can be used to send stereo bi-directional audio coded at 128 kbit/s with 20 Hz – 20 kHz audio bandwidth, although commonly the G.722 algorithm is used with a single 64 kbit/s B channel to send much lower latency mono audio at the expense of audio quality. Where very high quality audio is required multiple ISDN BRIs can be used in parallel to provide a higher bandwidth circuit switched connection. BBC Radio 3 commonly makes use of three ISDN BRIs to carry 320 kbit/s audio stream for live outside broadcasts. ISDN BRI services are used to link remote studios, sports grounds and outside broadcasts into the main broadcast studio. ISDN via satellite is used by field reporters around the world. It is also common to use ISDN for the return audio links to remote satellite broadcast vehicles.

In many countries, such as the UK and Australia, ISDN has displaced the older technology of equalised analogue landlines, with these circuits being phased out by telecommunications providers. Use of IP-based streaming codecs such as Comrex ACCESS and ipDTL is becoming more widespread in the broadcast sector, using broadband internet to connect remote studios.

=== Backup lines ===
Providing a backup line for business's inter-office and internet connectivity was a popular use of the technology.

== International deployment ==
A study of the Germany's Federal Ministry of Education and Research shows the following share of ISDN-channels per 1,000 inhabitants in 2005:

- Norway 401
- Denmark 339
- Germany 333
- Switzerland 331
- Japan 240
- United Kingdom 160
- Finland 160
- Sweden 135
- Italy 105
- France 85
- Spain 58
- United States 47

=== Australia ===
Telstra provides the business customer with the ISDN services. There are five types of ISDN services which are ISDN2, ISDN2 Enhanced, ISDN10, ISDN20 and ISDN30. Telstra changed the minimum monthly charge for voice and data calls. In general, there are two group of ISDN service types; The Basic Rate services – ISDN 2 or ISDN 2 Enhanced. Another group of types are the Primary Rate services, ISDN 10/20/30. Telstra announced that the new sales of ISDN product would be unavailable as of 31 January 2018. The final exit date of ISDN service and migration to the new service was on 31 May 2022.

=== France ===
Orange offers ISDN services under their product name Numeris (2 B+D), of which a professional Duo and home Itoo version is available. ISDN is generally known as RNIS in France and has widespread availability. The introduction of ADSL is reducing ISDN use for data transfer and Internet access, although it is still common in more rural and outlying areas, and for applications such as business voice and point-of-sale terminals. In 2023, Numeris services will enter a phase-out process. They will be replaced by VoIP services.

=== Germany ===
In Germany, ISDN was very popular with an installed base of 25 million channels (29% of all subscriber lines in Germany as of 2003 and 20% of all ISDN channels worldwide). Due to the success of ISDN, the number of installed analog lines was decreasing. Deutsche Telekom (DTAG) offered both BRI and PRI. Competing phone companies often offered ISDN only and no analog lines. However, these operators generally offered free hardware that also allows the use of POTS equipment, such as NTBAs ("Network Termination for ISDN Basic rate Access": small devices that bridge the two-wire UK0 line to the four-wire S0 bus) with integrated terminal adapters. Because of the widespread availability of ADSL services, ISDN was primarily used for voice and fax traffic.

Until 2007 ISDN (BRI) and ADSL/VDSL were often bundled on the same line, mainly because the combination of DSL with an analog line had no cost advantage over a combined ISDN-DSL line. This practice turned into an issue for the operators when vendors of ISDN technology stopped manufacturing it and spare parts became hard to come by. Since then phone companies started introducing cheaper xDSL-only products using VoIP for telephony, also in an effort to reduce their costs by operating separate data & voice networks.

Since approximately 2010, most German operators have offered more and more VoIP on top of DSL lines and ceased offering ISDN lines. New ISDN lines have been no longer available in Germany since 2018, existing ISDN lines were phased out from 2016 onwards and existing customers were encouraged to move to DSL-based VoIP products. Deutsche Telekom intended to phase-out by 2018 but announced the complete transition in 2020. Other providers like Vodafone estimate to have their phase-out completed by 2022.

=== Greece ===
OTE, the incumbent telecommunications operator, offers ISDN BRI (BRA) services in Greece. Following the launch of ADSL in 2003, the importance of ISDN for data transfer began to decrease and is today limited to niche business applications with point-to-point requirements.

=== India ===
Bharat Sanchar Nigam Limited, Reliance Communications and Bharti Airtel are the largest communication service providers, and offer both ISDN BRI and PRI services across the country. Reliance Communications and Bharti Airtel uses the DLC technology for providing these services. With the introduction of broadband technology, the load on bandwidth is being absorbed by ADSL. ISDN continues to be an important backup network for point-to-point leased line customers such as banks, e-Seva Centers, Life Insurance Corporation of India, and SBI ATMs.

=== Japan ===
On April 19, 1988, Japanese telecommunications company NTT began offering nationwide ISDN services trademarked INS Net 64, and INS Net 1500, a fruition of NTT's independent research and trial from the 1970s of what it referred to the INS (Information Network System).

Previously, in April 1985, Japanese digital telephone exchange hardware made by Fujitsu was used to experimentally deploy the world's first I interface ISDN. The I interface, unlike the older and incompatible Y interface, is what modern ISDN services use today.

Since 2000, NTT's ISDN offering have been known as FLET's ISDN, incorporating the "FLET's" brand that NTT uses for all of its ISP offerings.

In Japan, the number of ISDN subscribers dwindled as alternative technologies such as ADSL, cable Internet access, and fiber to the home gained greater popularity. On November 2, 2010, NTT announced plans to migrate their backend from PSTN to the IP network from around 2020 to around 2025. For this migration, ISDN services will be retired, and fiber optic services are recommended as an alternative.

=== Norway ===
On April 19, 1988, Norwegian telecommunications company Telenor began offering nationwide ISDN services trademarked INS Net 64, and INS Net 1500, a fruition of NTT's independent research and trial from the 1970s of what it referred to the INS (Information Network System).

=== United Kingdom ===
In the United Kingdom, British Telecom (BT) provides ISDN2e (BRI) as well as ISDN30 (PRI). Until April 2006, they also offered services named Home Highway and Business Highway, which were BRI ISDN-based services that offered integrated analogue connectivity as well as ISDN. Later versions of the Highway products also included built-in USB sockets for direct computer access. Home Highway was bought by many home users, usually for Internet connection, although not as fast as ADSL, because it was available before ADSL and in places where ADSL does not reach.

In early 2015, BT announced their intention to retire the UK's ISDN infrastructure by 2025. The shutdown period has since been extended to 31 January 2027 in line with the shutdown of PSTN.

=== United States and Canada ===
ISDN-BRI never gained popularity as a general use telephone access technology in Canada and the US, and remains a niche product. The service was seen as "a solution in search of a problem", and the extensive array of options and features were difficult for customers to understand and use. ISDN has long been known by derogatory backronyms highlighting these issues, such as It Still Does Nothing, Innovations Subscribers Don't Need, and I Still Don't kNow, or, from the supposed standpoint of telephone companies, I Smell Dollars Now.

Although various minimum bandwidths have been used in definitions of Broadband Internet access, ranging up from 64 kbit/s up to 1.0 Mbit/s, the 2006 OECD report is typical by defining broadband as having download data transfer rates equal to or faster than 256 kbit/s, while the United States FCC, in 2008, defined broadband as anything above 768 kbit/s. Once the term "broadband" came to be associated with data rates incoming to the customer at 256 kbit/s or more, and alternatives like ADSL grew in popularity, the consumer market for BRI did not develop and is effectively discontinued. Its only remaining advantage that it had, is that while ADSL has a functional distance limitation and can use ADSL loop extenders, BRI had a greater limit and could use repeaters. As such, BRI would have possibly been acceptable for customers who were too remote for ADSL. Widespread use of BRI was further stymied by some small North American CLECs such as CenturyTel having given up on it and not providing Internet access using it. However, AT&T would still have been able to have installed an ISDN BRI line anywhere in most states a normal analog line could have been placed (especially the former SBC/SWB territory) until discontinuation in 2021.

ISDN-BRI is currently primarily used in industries with specialized and very specific needs. High-end videoconferencing hardware can bond up to 8 B-channels together (using a BRI circuit for every 2 channels) to provide digital, circuit-switched video connections to almost anywhere in the world. This is very expensive, and is being replaced by IP-based conferencing, but where cost concern is less of an issue than predictable quality and where a QoS-enabled IP does not exist, BRI is the preferred choice.

Most modern non-VoIP PBXs use ISDN-PRI circuits. These are connected via T1 lines with the central office switch, replacing older analog two-way and direct inward dialing (DID) trunks. PRI is capable of delivering Calling Line Identification (CLID) in both directions so that the telephone number of an extension, rather than a company's main number, can be sent. It is still commonly used in recording studios and some radio programs, when a voice-over actor or host is in one studio conducting remote work, but the director and producer are in a studio at another location. The ISDN protocol delivers channelized, not-over-the-Internet service, powerful call setup and routing features, faster setup and tear down, superior audio fidelity as compared to plain old telephone service (POTS), lower delay and, at higher densities, lower cost.

In 2013, Verizon announced it would no longer take orders for ISDN service in the Northeastern United States and Verizon's remaining ISDN services were discontinued and shut down throughout 2025 and 2026. In 2019, iHeartMedia, the largest network of radio stations within the United States completed the transition from ISDN to SIP for their internal broadcast circuits. In 2021, AT&T discontinued ISDN service, marking the final consumer-facing network service provider to discontinue ISDN for home or small business use in the US.

== See also ==
- ISDN User Part
- Common ISDN Application Programming Interface
- Asynchronous Transfer Mode
- B-ISDN
- ETSI
- List of device bandwidths
