= Basic Rate Interface =

ISDN configuration

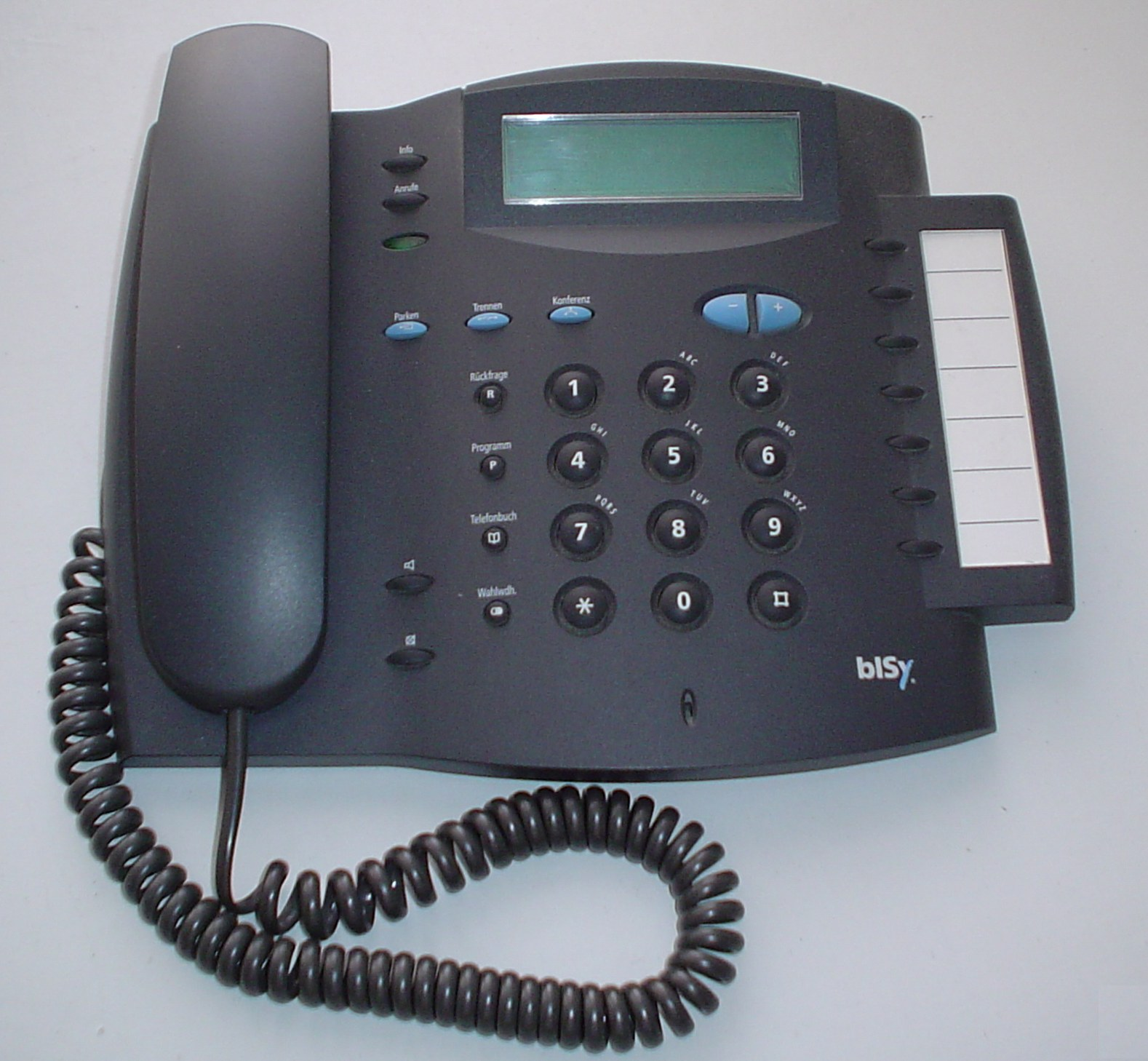
An ISDN phone

Basic Rate Interface (BRI, 2B+D, 2B1D) or Basic Rate Access is an Integrated Services Digital Network (ISDN) configuration intended primarily for use in subscriber lines similar to those that have long been used for voice-grade telephone service. As such, an ISDN BRI connection can use the existing telephone infrastructure at a business.

The BRI configuration provides 2 data (bearer) channels (B channels) at 64 kbit/s each and 1 control (delta) channel (D channel) at 16 kbit/s. The B channels are used for voice or user data, and the D channel is used for any combination of data, control signaling, and X.25 packet networking. The 2 B channels can be aggregated by channel bonding providing a total data rate of 128 kbit/s. The BRI ISDN service is commonly installed for residential or small business service (ISDN PABX) in many countries.

In contrast to the BRI, the Primary Rate Interface (PRI) configuration provides more B channels and operates at a higher bit rate.

== Physical interfaces ==
The BRI is split in two sections: a) in-house cabling (S/T reference point or S-bus) from the ISDN terminal up to the network termination 1 (NT1) and b) transmission from the NT1 to the central office (U reference point).

- The in-house part is defined in I.430 produced by the International Telecommunication Union (ITU). The S/T-interface (S_{0}) uses four wires; one pair for the uplink and another pair for the downlink. It offers a full-duplex mode of operation. The I.430 protocol defines 48-bit packets comprising 16 bits from the B1 channel, 16 bits from B2 channel, 4 bits from the D channel, and 12 bits used for synchronization purposes. These packets are sent at a rate of 4 kHz, resulting in a gross bit rate of 192 kbit/s and – giving the data rates listed above – a maximum possible throughput of 144kbit/s. The S_{0} offers point-to-point or point-to-multipoint operation; Max length: 900 metres (3,000 ft) (point-to-point), 300 metres (980 ft) (point-to-multipoint).
- The U_{p} Interface uses two wires. The gross bit rate is 160 kbit/s; 144 kbit/s throughput, 12 kbit/s sync and 4 kbit/s maintenance. The signals on the U reference point are encoded by two modulation techniques: 2B1Q in North America, Italy and Switzerland, and 4B3T elsewhere. Depending on the applicable cable length, two varieties are implemented, U_{pN} and U_{p0}. The U_{k0} interface uses one wire pair with echo cancellation for the long last mile cable between the telephone exchange and the network terminator. The maximum length of this BRI section is between 4 and 8 kilometres (2.5 and 5.0 mi).
