= Channel service unit =

Telecommunications equipment

In telecommunications, a channel service unit (CSU) is a line bridging device for use with T-carrier, which

- is used to perform loopback testing;
- may perform bit stuffing;
- may also provide a framing and formatting pattern compatible with the network;
- provides a barrier for electrical interference from either side of the unit; and
- is the last signal regeneration point, on the loop side, coming from the central office, before the regenerated signal reaches a multiplexer or data terminal equipment (DTE).

== Common varieties ==
CSUs can be categorized by the class of service they support (DS1, DS3, DDS, etc.) and by the capabilities within that class. For example, basic DS1 (T1) CSUs support loopback of each interface and will produce alarm indication signal to the provider's network interface device (NID) in the event of loss of signal from the customer-premises equipment (CPE). More advanced units will include internal monitors of the performance of the carrier in both directions and may have test pattern generation and monitor capabilities.

== Common practice ==
CSUs are required by PSTN providers at digital interfaces that terminate in a DSU on the customer side. They are not used when the service terminates in a modem, such as the DSL family of service. The maintenance capabilities of the CSU provide important guidance as to whether the provider needs to dispatch a repairman to the customer location.

== See also ==
- CSU/DSU
