= S interface =

Interface reference point

The S interface or S reference point, also known as S_{0}, is a user–network interface reference point in an ISDN BRI environment, characterized by a four-wire circuit using 144 kbit/s (2 bearer and 1 signaling channel; 2B+D) user rate.

The S interface is the connection between ISDN terminal equipment (TE) or terminal adapters (TAs) and an NT1 (network terminator, type 1.) Not all TE or TAs connect externally to an S interface, but instead integrate an NT1 so they can connect directly to a U interface (local loop from central office.)

Contrast to the T interface, which connects between an NT2 (PBX or other local switching device) and NT1. However, the S interface is electrically equivalent to the T interface, and the two are jointly referred to as the S/T interface.

The S interface operates at 4000 48-bit frames per second; i.e., 192 kbit/s, with a user portion of 36 bits per frame; i.e., 144 kbit/s.

== See also ==
- R interface
- T interface
- U interface
