= Community dial office =

A "Community Dial Office" (CDO) was a small Class 5 telephone exchange in a rural area.

These most often provided capacity for 1,000 or fewer customers and were designed for unattended operation. CDOs could be step by step, all relay or crossbar. Many offices provided four-digit local dialling to small rural communities where a call outside the local exchange was long distance.

Initial deployments were based on step-by-step equipment such as the Western Electric 350A (first deployed on May 27, 1928, in Arcadia, California) and its successor models 360A, 355A and 356A. These switches had some design similarities to No. 1 step-by-step systems already in use in large offices (10,000 subscribers or more) but were of a simpler design (line finders would only need to scan hundreds of lines instead of the thousands in use in the cities) and not designed for expandability.

Any operator assistance or toll call billing for these unattended stations was handled remotely at a larger exchange in the city.

In the 1960s, Northern Electric developed the SA-1 community dial office as a small Class 5 crossbar switch for local use in rural areas.

In the late 1970s, Western Electric's number 3 Electronic Switching System (ESS) was installed in small communities with up to 4,500 telephone lines; it also served as a workhorse in some large private branch exchange installations.

Late in the 20th century the smallest offices were replaced by remote concentrators connected to a host office in an adjacent exchange area, which may be several miles away. Others were replaced with distributed switching hardware (a remote switching centre controlled by a digital switch in the city) or with small digital switches such as Nortel's DMS-10 (a self-contained exchange for up to 8,000 subscribers).
