= Trunk versus toll telephony =

Trunk and toll calling were two alternative methods of charging customers for long-distance calls in the United Kingdom in the first half of the 20th century. The distinction became obsolete with the introduction of subscriber trunk dialling (STD).

== History ==
In the UK, local as well as long-distance telephone calls were chargeable to the caller and the term trunk calling was adopted for long-distance calls.

Initially a trunk call had to be booked in advance and a switchboard operator called the subscriber when the call set-up was completed; a process known as 'delay working'. Due to increasing demands for trunk calls from London and the associated delays in connecting them, calls to exchanges adjacent to the London director area were transferred to a new toll exchange opened on 17 September 1921. Calls to toll area exchanges were connected on-demand whilst the originating subscriber waited, thus improving service and reducing operator costs. The London Toll Area boundary was extended in 1923 and again in 1928, so that eventually Southampton, Portsmouth, Reading, Bedford, Colchester and the whole of Kent and Sussex were included. The system was later introduced to other large cities and remained in use until the late 1950s when, with the advent of Subscriber Trunk Dialling, Toll was eventually phased out. The name toll was probably taken from US usage.

In London, telephone calls to subscribers who were not serviced by Director telephone systems within local call-charging range of the London Director exchange area were carried by tandem exchange Toll A: a subscriber would dial a prefix code, typically two letters plus zero, one or two figures (e.g. DA, EP5, LK85) followed by the number of the other subscriber on the fringe non-director exchange. To avoid confusion, three-letter dialling codes were not used for calls from the director area to the fringe area, even if they corresponded to the same holes in the dial (e.g. the Hoddesdon and Mogador codes were HO3 and MO4 respectively). Calls from fringe non-director exchanges to numbers within the director area were passed in two ways. For those to director exchanges near the area boundary adjacent to the non-director exchange, subscribers were often given numerical codes to dial, and told to follow the code with the numerical portion of the other subscriber's number: these direct routings permitted the use of short unamplified lines. For director exchanges remote from the area boundary, the subscriber was told to dial a code (typically 7, 87 or exceptionally 1), to wait for a second dialling tone, and to follow this with the three letters and four figures of the other number. These calls were handled by tandem exchange Toll B, from which the second dialling tone originated. To have a second dialling tone in this way was very unusual on the PSTN in the UK, although the French and Belgian PTTs had a similar instruction for when their customers made international calls.

The distinction between trunk and toll became irrelevant when subscriber trunk dialling was introduced.

In North America, local telephone calls were typically unmetered and included in flat rate billing. The term toll calling was adopted for long-distance calls which were subject to toll charges.
