= RLU =

RLU may refer to:

- Rectified linear unit, a neuron activation function used in neural networks, usually referred to as an ReLU
- Relative light unit, a unit for measuring cleanliness by measuring the levels of Adenosine Triphosphate
- Remote line unit, a type of switch in the GTD-5 EAX switching system
- RLU-1 Breezy, an American homebuilt aircraft design
- Rusline, a Russian airline whose ICAO airline code is RLU
