= Toll switching trunk =

Element of American telephony

In telecommunications, a toll switching trunk or toll connecting trunk is a trunk connecting an end office to a toll center as the first stage of concentration for intertoll or long-distance traffic.

Operator assistance or participation may be an optional function. In U.S. common carrier telephony service, a toll center designated Class 4C is an office where assistance in completing incoming calls is provided in addition to other traffic; a toll center designated Class 4P is an office where operators handle only outbound calls, or where switching is performed without operator assistance.

== See also ==
- Class-4 telephone switch
