= PSTN network topology =

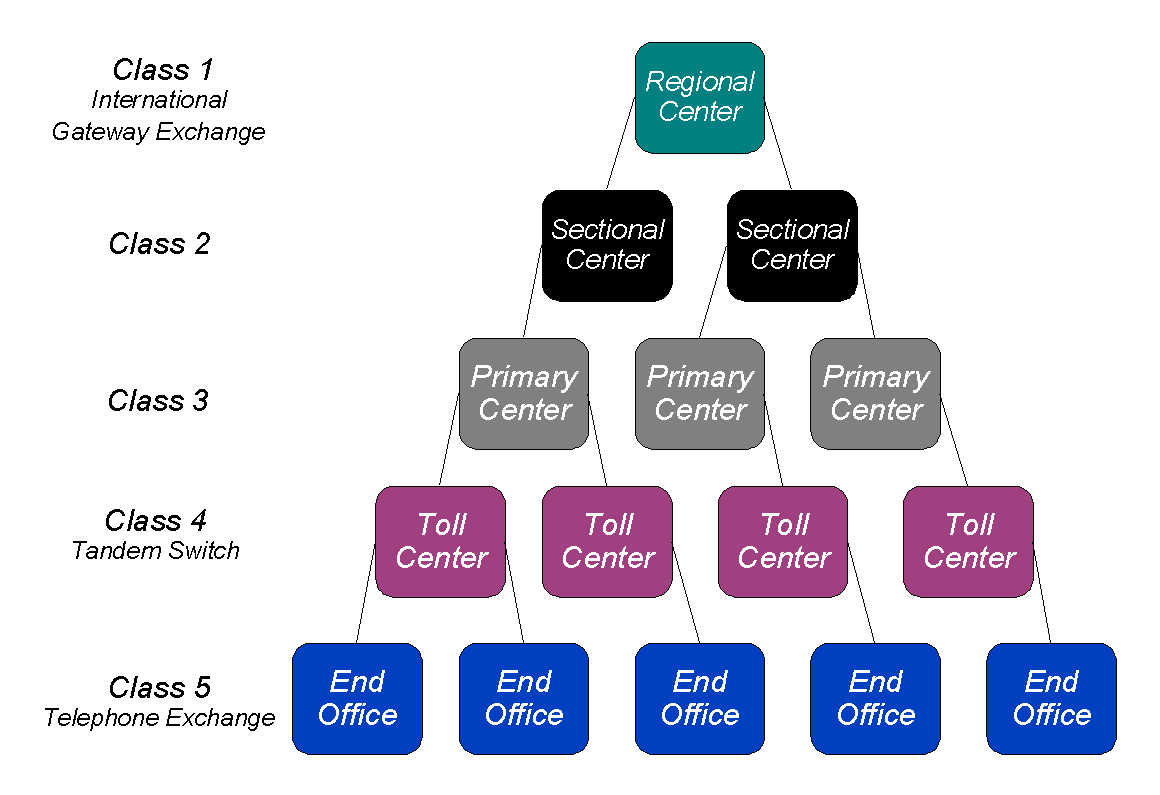

PSTN network topology is the switching network topology of a telephone network connected to the public switched telephone network (PSTN).

In the United States and Canada, the Bell System network topology was the switching system hierarchy implemented and operated from c. 1930 to the 1980s for the purpose of integrating the diverse array of local telephone companies and telephone numbering plans to achieve nationwide Direct Distance Dialing (DDD) by telephone subscribers. It was the precursor of the world-wide interconnected public switched telephone network (PSTN) and originated in the efforts of the General Toll Switching Plan that by 1929 formulated the technical infrastructure and the operating principles for connecting long-distance telephone calls in North America.

The ideas were first developed in the Bell System in the United States, but were soon adopted by other countries where telephone companies were facing similar issues, even when servicing smaller geographic areas. The system in the United Kingdom implemented by the General Post Office resulted in fewer switching levels than in the Bell System.

== Bell System ==
AT&T central office classification hierarchy

In the late 1940s the Bell System devised plans to consolidate the various incompatible local telephone numbering plans of affiliated and independent service providers in North America into a unified numbering and routing system, that later became known as the North American Numbering Plan (NANP). Initially designed for use in Operator Toll Dialing, the reorganization was also a prerequisite for Direct Distance Dialing (DDD) by customers, first implemented in Englewood, New Jersey in 1951. In addition to devising a unified numbering plan, the American Telephone and Telegraph Company (AT&T) reorganized the switching and routing plan under management by AT&T Long Lines into a hierarchical network with five levels, termed classes of switching systems.

The newly devised hierarchy was maintained into the early 1980s, when technological advances and business models rendered it increasingly obsolete, but the hierarchical features live on in terms, such as Class 4 and Class 5 telephone switch, referring to tandem and end-office switches, respectively. The PSTN in the United States was essentially restructured with the 1984 divestiture of AT&T. The old Long Lines network remained with AT&T, but its internal routing became non-hierarchical with the introduction of advanced computer-controlled switching. Each major long-distance carrier can have its own internal routing policies, though they generally start with the same principles and even components.

With Bell System divestiture, the network in the US was divided into local access and transport areas (LATAs). Calls within LATAs were carried by Local Exchange Carriers (LECs), while calls between them were carried by interexchange carriers (IXCs). LATAs generally have one or more tandem switches which interconnect end office switches.

While the following discussion refers to AT&T and (principally) to the United States, it is important to remember that until 1975, AT&T controlled Bell Canada and thus influenced corporate decisions north of the border. Bell Canada provided local operations in most of Ontario and Quebec, and both in its capacity as the largest telecommunications carrier in Canada and because of its historic operations in the Atlantic and Prairie provinces, dominated decisions over long-distance practices. Canadian authorities agreed that integration of Canadian long-distance services into a trans-national network was valuable to both countries, so that U.S. and Canadian services were integrated for networking capabilities at an early stage into what eventually became the foundation for the North American Numbering Plan area.

By the mid-1920s, a revised manual system where "local" toll operators connected tandem routes (a process formally called Combined Line and Recording) as needed to complete telephone calls, reduced the process to an average of two minutes, but still meant that some complex routing might interconnect as many as sixteen points. As long-distance services grew in the Contiguous Continental US (48 states) and Canada, the amount of overhead equipment and people required to determine and establish Rates and Routes became excessive. As technology improved, network design included consideration of more automated and defined procedures. Thus, beginning with a switch installed in Philadelphia, Pennsylvania, in 1943, AT&T began to automate the system, and establish a new switch hierarchy, which lasted until the breakup of AT&T in the 1980s.

The underlying principle of the five-level hierarchy was to provide economies of scale by establishing direct connections between centralized call "collection points" (essentially the Class 4 offices) where economically feasible, and to provide additional concentration points (Class 1 through 3) to handle overflow traffic that could not be handled directly, or to handle traffic to locations which were less likely to be dialed from a given point - usually longer distances and/or smaller locations in other parts of the North American dialing plan. The North American plan differed from those of other continents in the existence of three concentration levels of hierarchy for domestic (here defined as including all those points "within" the dialing plan) calls, a need not required where the larger geographic area was broken into several national plan jurisdictions. This was not a strict hierarchy of absolute levels. If enough call traffic existed between geographic areas, for example, a Class 4 office could have direct trunk connections not only to a Class 3 office, but to a Class 2 or Class 1 office, and vice versa. For example, the Class 2 switch in Toronto (TOROON0101T2) had connections not only to the Class 1 switch in Montréal (MTRLPQ0201T1), but to the Class 1 switch in White Plains (WHPLNY0201T1), one of the Class 2 switches in New York City (NYCMNYAA02T2) and a Class 3 switch in Buffalo (BFLONYFR04T3). Network engineers re-worked the system as necessary to balance off call completion percentages with budgetary limitations. In fact, minor changes were made almost every month.

Initially excluded from the development of the North American network were locations that eventually would become part of the North American Numbering Plan Area - Alaska, Hawaii, some other United States possessions, various outlying Northern and rural portions of Canada, and much of the Caribbean. These areas were handled as International Calls until more advanced computer hardware and software allowed them to be included in the automated, integrated systems in later decades. After the spread of stored program control switching, many services of Class 1 through 3 could be delegated to newer switches in the class 4 and 5 offices, and that portion of the network became obsolete, although it was partially replaced by the establishment of multiple long-distance carrier networks, connected to the local networks through their points of presence.

=== Class 1 (Regional Center) ===
The class 1 office was the Regional Center (RC). Regional centers served three purposes in the North American toll network (a) their connections were the "last resort" for final setup of calls when routes between centers lower in the hierarchy were not available (b) they were initially staffed by engineers who had the authority to block portions of the network within the region in case of emergencies or network congestion - although these functions were transferred after 1962 to the Network Control/Operations Center and the distributed Network Management Centers (see below) (c) they provided collection points (until the development of more advanced computer hardware and software for toll operators) for circuits that would be passed along to one of the international overseas gateways (which operated as special centers outside the formal North American hierarchy). The regional centers updated each other on the status of every circuit in the network. These centers would then reroute traffic around the trouble spots and keep each informed at all times. There were twelve Regional Centers in North America, ten in the United States, nine of which were operated by AT&T (White Plains, NY, Wayne, PA, Pittsburgh, PA, Norway, IL [a rural crossroads west of Chicago at the intersection of US highway 52 and IL highway 71 - an underground office built with hardened construction to withstand nuclear attack], Conyers, GA in Rockdale County, St Louis, MO, Dallas, TX, Denver, CO, Sacramento, CA), and one in a GTE service area (San Bernardino, CA). Two centres in Canada were operated on behalf of the Trans-Canada Telephone System, one by Bell Canada (Montréal, PQ), and one by Saskatchewan Telephone, (Regina, SK).

For control and oversight of the entire network hierarchy, AT&T established a Network Control Center in New York City in 1962, renamed the Network Operations Center and relocated to Bedminster, NJ in 1977. Engineering supervision was also centralized in eight regional Network Management Centers. The realignment and dispersion of functions were done, in part, to ensure maximum network integrity in the event of a national emergency, a major concern in that era. The basic structure of this unit, although significantly altered since the AT&T divestiture in the 1980s, still exists as the Global Operations Center, with domestic regional centers in Colorado and Georgia.

=== Class 2 (Sectional Center) ===
The class 2 office was the Sectional Center (SC). The sectional center typically connected major toll centers within one or two states or provinces, or a significant portion of a large state or province, to provide interstate or interprovincial connections for long-distance calls. At various times, there were between 50 and 75 active class two offices in the network.

=== Class 3 (Primary Center) ===
The class 3 office was the Primary Center (PC). Calls being made beyond the limits of a small geographical area where circuits are not connected directly between class 4 toll offices would be passed from the toll center to the primary center. These locations use high usage trunks to complete connection between toll centers. The primary center never served dial tone to the user. The number of primary centers in the network fluctuated from time to time, ranging between 150 and 230.

=== Class 4 (Toll Center) ===
The class 4 office is the Toll Center (TC), Toll Point (TP), or Intermediate Point (IP). A call going between two end offices not directly connected, or whose direct trunks are busy, is routed through the toll center. The toll center is also used to connect to the long-distance network for calls where added costs are incurred, such as operator handled services. This toll center may also be called the tandem office because calls have to pass through this location to get to another part of the network. Toll centers might have been operated either as interstate facilities, under the operation of AT&T Long Lines (GTE in a few cases), or by local telephone companies, handling long-distance traffic to points within a particular operating company territory. Class 4 offices continue to exist, although with considerable changes, as they handle local exchange company interconnections, locally charged or long-distance rated, or provide facilities for connection to long-distance company points of presence.

=== Class 5 (local exchange) ===
The class 5 office is the local exchange or end office. It delivers dial tone to the customer. The end office, also called a branch exchange, is the closest connection to the end customer. Over 19,000 end offices in the United States alone provide basic dial tone services.

In modern times only the terms Class 4 and Class 5 are much used, as any tandem office is referred to as a Class 4 system. This change was prompted in part by changes in the power of switches and the relative cost of transmission, both of which tended to flatten the switch hierarchy. The breakup of the Bell System, and the need for each of the surviving regional operating companies to handle long-distance interconnections, also promoted the inclusion of inter-regional and international processing through larger Class 4 offices.

=== International overseas call centers ===
The special requirements of placing calls to locations outside main Canadian/United States points meant that these calls were handled by special operators in locations where connections could be monitored to other countries. The technology to automate these connections through "regular" operator traffic positions began to develop in the 1960s (see Bell Laboratories Record 42:7, July–August 1964). As the decade of the 1970s progressed, North American customers who were served by electronic offices began to be able to directly dial to an increasing number of international points, a service known as IDDD (International Direct Distance Dialing), (service between ESS offices in New York and London began on March 1, 1970). However, since points could not be connected until equipment in both countries was converted to electronic switching, implementation to many locations took some time, and while the majority of calls began to be connected via automated systems by the 1990s - after the termination of the five-level hierarchy - the majority of countries were still connected via manual intervention until the beginning of the 21st century.

Please note that the currently attached diagram of switch hierarchy is incorrect, as it identifies Class 1 points with International switching. International connections were located in places generally close to cable, later satellite, termination locations, and were not directly related to Class 1 switches. Major international connection points were located in Oakland, California; Miami, Florida; and New York, New York, with a number of secondary international operator toll points. Only after the rapid expansion of ESS terminal offices did operator handling of international calls begin to be off-loaded into the domestic network structure, as international calling services began to be customer dialable, ca. the mid-1980s. This in part paralleled the demise of the five-level hierarchy, so identification of international switches and class one offices is incorrect.

== United Kingdom ==
The forerunner of British Telecom, the General Post Office, also organized its intercity trunk network along similar hierarchical lines to that of North America. However, because of the significantly smaller geographic area involved, fewer levels of connection were required, and no formal numbering of class offices was made.

There were a few special exceptions to the following description, notably those involving Northern Ireland, some of the Channel Dependencies, and the few locations in England which were served by non-GPO companies, such as Hull (KCOM Group) and Portsmouth.

In the early days of manual exchanges, outlying areas (eventually called dependent exchanges) were connected through progressively larger locations (eventually called group switching centres) into one of the main cities - Birmingham, Edinburgh, Glasgow, Liverpool, London, and Manchester. As automation began to be established in the network, this was refined into a system of approximately fifty tandem locations for Group Switching Centres, with an additional layer of perhaps a dozen Wide Area Tandems to provide for busy periods, emergency routing, etc. There were also some additional Local Tandems to handle traffic in the London Metropolitan Area without involving the GSCs, although this was a later development, as it required common control signalling for identification.

=== Subscriber trunk dialing ===
The dialing codes used by trunk operators to connect calls were originally assigned and established to ensure speed with pulse dialing equipment. With the advent of subscriber dialed calls, numbering patterns were reassigned to provide for mnemonic methods of improving customer performance. Subscriber trunk dialling (STD) codes all began with 0. The largest cities, which had seven digit local numbers, were allocated special codes - London, 01; Birmingham, 021; etc. Smaller towns were typically allocated a code based on the first letters of their name, translated into digits on the telephone dial. For example, OXford translated into 09 on the British phone dial, so the original STD code for Oxford was 0096. However, because of subscriber dialing errors, there was an early decision to eliminate codes that began with 00 and Oxford soon became 0865, the sequence 86 designating the first two letter of university.

Some of the smallest towns connected to the trunk network only through nearby switches. In those cases, STD codes were composed of combination of the code for the nearby switch, plus some additional digits that were unused in that nearby switch, but which served two purposes (1) to identify the end location, and allow the nearby switch to complete the call (2) to "pad out" the overall length of the dialing string, since a small town might only have a three-digit telephone number, and allow the network to move to a more-standard number length.

As Strowger switches were retired and replaced with electronic systems, Subscriber Trunk Dialing codes no longer followed the original rules, and were significantly revised in the mid-1990s, with further changes as wider use of mobile phones and non-BT competition came into the UK market. There are now some 70000 local exchange codes in use in the UK. The largest trunk carrier, British Telecom, connects the local network through some 60 transit (tandem) switches.

== France ==
=== Early days ===
The early history of the telecommunications switching network in France is, unusually for this country, one of decentralized development. Early telephone exchanges were installed by local communities, often by private companies, and only later taken over by the French government. As a result, by 1930, France was served by almost 25,000 local exchanges, but almost half of these had fewer than five subscribers. Additionally, telephones were not considered important for residential customers (nor for small businesses), so France had a low penetration rate of telephone subscribers.

Under these conditions, early network development revolved around two major distinctions, "Paris" and "not Paris." Within metropolitan Paris, automated step-by-step (Strowger) switches appeared, with a level of tandem switching, before World War II. In the rest of the country, automation was confined to major cities, with a high level of manual intervention.

The French telephone system was heavily damaged in World War II, so that by the end of the War only about 140 automatic exchanges (mostly in Paris and its "banlieues") and 228 manual exchanges were fully operational. Repair of much of the network had been deferred during the war due to lack of parts, as well as co-opting of technical personnel for German military needs.

=== Postwar recovery ===
Recovery was rapid after the war, and the extensive damage in some ways helped the modernization of the system as new technology was introduced. The DGT (Direction Générale des Télécommunications) introduced automated operator dialing of long-distance connections, generally using the INSEE codes as "area codes" for the various departments - with special handling for Paris. These codes subsequently became public as customer dialing of long-distance calls began to be introduced in the late 1960s and early 1970s.

The network had a minimal hierarchy, with most connections routed into a central tandem in each department, and from there to Paris. As greater installation of private telephones, for both small business and private residences, increased in the 1970s, direct connections among the tandems in adjacent regions were installed, and a three-level tier of switches, local, tandem, and regional interconnection was implemented, with final routing through Paris. Also, during the 1970s and 1980s, the smaller rural switches were replaced and combined with nearby automated offices, and a closed numbering scheme was adopted for dialing consistency.

=== Technological development ===
In common with most countries, the development of technology allowed for different networking, and the maintenance of a formal hierarchy disappeared into a distributed network. By the mid-1990s, a revised structure had appeared, reflected by the replacement of the old departmental area codes by the assignment of regional codes and a major renumbering scheme for strategic planning, privatization, and deregulation under the auspices of ART, the Autorité de Régulation des Communications Électroniques, des Postes et de la Distribution de la Presse (Regulatory Authority for Telecommunications - known since 2005 as ARCEP, as responsibility for postal services was added and later expanded in 2019 to print media distribution). After 1996, the country prepared for complete deregulation of the telephone network.

Thus, the local exchanges (zones à autonomie d'acheminement) are connected somewhat differently by various carriers. However, the largest of these, based upon the (partially) privatised former government network, is a two-level long-distance hierarchy, based on 80 CTS (centre de transit secondaire) and 8 CTP (centre de transit primaire) locations. In addition, there are 12 CTI (centre de transit internationaux) for connections to areas which are not integrated into the French telephone network [note that some overseas locations are considered "domestic" for telecommunications purposes].
