= Toll (telecommunications) =

Toll, in the telecom industry, refers to a charge collected by either an Incumbent Local Exchange Carrier, or a Competitive Local Exchange Carrier on a telephone call.

Toll is one class of charges in telecom. Typically, it is charged for crossing a boundary, whether the boundary is a Local access and transport area (LATA), a Number Portability Administration Center (NPAC) region, or an international border.

== See also ==
- Toll switching trunk
