= Class-5 telephone switch =

Type of U.S. central office telephone switch

A class-5 telephone switch is a telephone exchange in the public switched telephone network (PSTN) that directly serves subscribers and manages subscriber calling features. Class-5 services include basic dial-tone, calling features, and additional digital and data services to subscribers connected to a local loop.

== Function ==
A class-5 switch provides telephone service to end customers locally in the exchange area, and thus it is concerned with "subscriber type" activities: generation of dial-tone and other "comfort noises"; handling of network services such as advice of duration and charge etc. Specifically, a class-5 switch provides dial tone, local switching and access to the rest of the network. Class-4 switches do not provide subscriber lines, their role is to route calls between other switches.

Typically a class-5 switch serves an area of a city, an individual town, or several villages and could serve from several hundred to 100,000 subscribers.

Since the replacement of electromechanical exchanges by modern digital ones, the function of a class-5 switch in rural areas is often performed by a remote switch or Remote Digital Terminal installed at the original switch site to handle local switching or concentration, respectively. The class-5 switching infrastructure is then physically located in a larger population center. Urban areas with extensive underground plant tend to keep the classic class-5 office architecture.

== Hardware ==
Before the office classification system for Direct Distance Dialing (DDD) was established, the principal designs in use for Class 5 in the US were crossbar systems, Panel switches, and Strowger-type step-by-step systems. The DDD program involved installations of large numbers of new 5XB crossbar switches in the 1950s and 1960s. In addition, 1ESS switches and their variants appeared in the 1960s. Most of these systems were removed in the late 20th century, primarily replaced in North America by DMS-10, DMS-100 and 5ESS switches in the Bell operating territories and the GTD-5 EAX in the GTE operating areas. Principal European products include Ericsson AXE telephone exchange, Siemens EWSD and Alcatel-Lucent S12 and E10.

In the 21st century, US and European service providers continued to upgrade their networks, replacing older DMS-10, DMS-100, 5ESS, GTD-5 and EWSD switches with Voice over IP technology.

== See also ==
- Community dial office
- PSTN network topology
- Softswitch
