= Concentrator =

In telecommunications, the term concentrator has the following meanings:

- In data transmission, a functional unit that permits a common path to handle more data sources than there are channels currently available within the path. A concentrator usually provides communication capability between many low-speed, usually asynchronous channels and one or more high-speed, usually synchronous channels. Usually different speeds, codes, and protocols can be accommodated on the low-speed side. The low-speed channels usually operate in contention and require buffering.
- A device that connects a number of links with only one destination, the main function of this device is to make a kind of load balancing between two or more servers connected together, data distribution is done according to the server processing rate.
- A patch panel or other component in the cable plant where cable runs converge.
- ISP used concentrators to enable modem dialing; this kind of concentrator is sometimes called a modem concentrator or a remote access concentrator. The term "access concentrator" is also used to describe similar provider edge equipment used in computer networks that doesn't rely on modems anymore, e.g. FTTH.

== Theory ==
In the evolution of modern telecommunications systems there was a requirement to connect large numbers of low-speed access devices with large telephone company 'central office' switches over common paths. During the first generations of digital networks, analog signals were digitized on line cards attached to the telephone exchange switches. In an effort to reduce local loop costs, it was decided to push this conversion closer to the customer premises by deploying small conversion devices in customer neighborhoods. These devices would combine multiple digital signals on a single link to a larger telephone switch, which would provide service to the customer. These devices were initially called remote concentrators or simply remotes.

In fibre-optic distribution systems which offer triple-play services (voice, television, internet) the digitization has arrived at the customer premises and signals are digitized at the source and combined using customer edge routers. This traffic enters the distribution network at an Optical Network Termination and is carried to the central office using Wavelength division multiplexing and Passive optical networking.

== See also ==
- Ethernet hub
- Oxygen concentrator (Medical application)
- Remote concentrator
- Concentrating solar power (Energy application)
