= PRX (telephony) =

The PRX205 (PRX/A) is a processor controlled reed relay telephone exchange developed by Philips Telecommunicatie Industrie BV (PTI) in Hilversum during the late 1960s and early 1970s. The first public switch was installed in Overvecht in Utrecht in 1972. About half of all sales were in the Netherlands; other countries with significant sales included Brazil, Indonesia, Peru and Jersey. The last PRX switch was taken out of service on 7 December 2010 at Volendam in the Netherlands.

The PRX digital version (PRX/D) was developed during the early 1980s in PTI's laboratories in Hilversum, Brussels and Malmesbury, Wiltshire but only went into limited production. PTI first went into partnership with AT&T in 1984 and then sold its remaining stake in the company to AT&T (later demerged into Lucent and subsequently merged to form Alcatel-Lucent) in 1987. After the takeover, the PRX/D development was stopped in favour of the AT&T 5ESS switch product, but development of PRX/A continued for some time afterwards. PRX/A systems were installed worldwide including many containerized versions and served reliably for 38 years.
