= Limited availability =

When customers of a public switched telephone network make telephone calls, they utilize a telecommunications network called a switched-circuit network. In a switched-circuit network, devices known as switches are used to connect the calling party to the called party. Each switch has a number of inlets and outlets, and by connecting a specific inlet to the correct outlet, each switch helps to complete an end-to-end circuit between users. This method is used in, for example graded multiple banks of selectors.

In a modern circuit-switched network, switches can connect any inlet to any outlet; this is known as full availability.
