= ITT System 12 =

Digital telephone exchange

System 1240 (later System 12) was a new Digital Telephone Exchange developed in 1977 by ITT Corporation. It reportedly cost US$1 billion. It anticipated the features of ISDN of the 1990s.

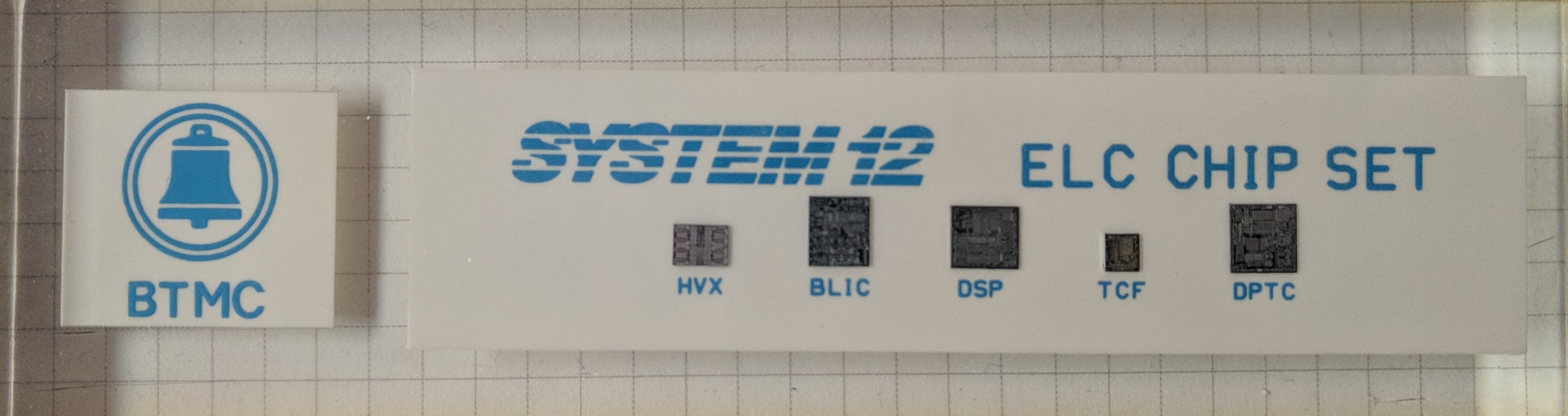
BTMC chipset of System 12

It was designed at the Advanced Technology Center (Stamford, Connecticut and then Shelton, Connecticut.) Manufacturing was by ITT's subsidiaries such as BTM in Belgium, where the first production system was installed at Brecht in August 1982.

Initial sales, particularly in Europe and Mexico, were strong, but the new system took longer than expected to integrate, with further losses. Against the advice of headquarters, ITT Telecommunications (ITT Kellogg) in Raleigh, North Carolina undertook the conversion to the US market, and although sales were announced in 1984 and 1985, the attempt ultimately failed, in early 1986.

== Reception ==
Fortune reported that "Araskog focused the company on an all-consuming push to develop and market System 12" and "shoveled profits from good businesses into System 12's insatiable maw". System 12 was intended to operate in all markets, and in all modes, from local switches to long distance.
