= Class-4 telephone switch =

Type of U.S. central office telephone switch

A class-4, or tandem, telephone switch is a U.S. telephone company central office telephone exchange used to interconnect local exchange carrier offices for long distance communications in the public switched telephone network.

A class-4 switch does not connect directly to telephones; instead, it connects to other class-4 switches and to class-5 telephone switches. The telephones of service subscribers are wired to class-5 switches. When a call is placed to a telephone that is not on the same class-5 switch as the originating subscriber, the call may be routed through one or more class-4 switches to reach its destination.

== Etymology ==
Tandem derives from the Latin adverb tandem meaning at length, and is used in English to mean a group of two people or machines working together, usually in series. A tandem switch is used to interconnect other switches via trunks. Thus, tandem switches are always part of a series of switches and lines that connect telephone callers to each other.

== Sector and access tandems ==
A sector tandem switch connects local telephone exchanges (class-5 switches) and carries traffic within the local access and transport area (LATA).

An access tandem switch connects local telephone exchanges to long-distance telephone companies (or interexchange carriers, "IXCs"). The point at which an access tandem connects to the IXC's switch is called the point of presence, or POP.

Modern tandem switches are often located at the center of the areas they serve, and may act as both sector tandems and access tandems.

== History ==
Before the Bell System divestiture, class-4 switches in a telephone office that had operators present were called "toll centers." If no operators were present, they were called "toll points." Either type of class-4 switch might be referred to as a "toll switch." These terms were used because long-distance, or "toll," calls had to pass through class-4 switches, where the billing for the calls would be handled.

Class-4 switches at that time often had an associated Traffic Service Position System (TSPS) to handle operator-assisted calls. TSPS automated many functions previously handled by the local operator with a "cordboard" telephone switch, such as certain aspects of coin-operated telephone calls. It also allowed the telephone company to route operator calls to remote locations, rather than requiring operators at each switch.

After the divestiture, as human operators became less common, the terms changed. Today, a class-4 switch that connects class-5 switches to the long-distance network is called an "access tandem." A class-4 switch that connects class-5 switches to each other, but not to the long-distance network, is called a "local tandem."

The majority of class-4 switches in the Bell System during the 1950s and 1960s used crossbar switches, such as the Crossbar Tandem (XBT) variant of the Number One Crossbar Switching System, or 1XB switch. The Number 4 Crossbar ("4XB") tandem switch was used in the North American toll network from 1943 until the 1990s, when it was replaced by more modern digital switching equipment, such as the Lucent 4ESS switch or the Nortel DMS-200. The last 4XB switch in the United States was installed in 1976.

During the 1980s, class-4 tandem switches were converted to deal only with high-speed digital four-wire circuit connections: T1, T3, OC-3, etc. The two-wire local line connections to individual telephones were relegated to the class-5 switches. By the dawn of the 21st century, almost all other switches also supported four-wire connections.

Modern tandem switches, like other classes of telephone switch, are digital, and use time-division multiplexing (TDM) to carry circuit-switched telephone calls. Tandems were more quickly converted to TDM than the class-5 end-offices were. During the transition to digital switching in the 1980s and 1990s, when both TDM and traditional "space division" (Note: "Space division" is a retronym used to distinguish traditional telephone trunk lines—where a call would fully occupy a set of wires within a "trunk," or bundle of wires, between switches—from the new TDM trunks, where more than one call could be placed on a pair of wires by digitizing the call and sending the data for each call in pre-defined "timeslots" assigned to the call.) switches were in use, American phone company employees often referred tandems as "TDM switches" as a result.

In the past, most of the accounting, billing management, and call record-keeping was handled by the tandem switches. During the last third of the 20th century, these tasks were performed by the class-5 end-office switches.

== Switching equipment ==
- The Lucent 4ESS is a digital switch widely used as a class-4 switch in the United States. It was developed by AT&T's Western Electric division, before that division was spun off as Lucent. The first 4ESS was installed in Chicago in 1976. The last 4ESS in the AT&T Long Lines network was installed in 1999. In the late 2010s and early 2020s, the traditional 4ESS switch is slowly being replaced by the Nokia N4E (New 4ESS) switch in the AT&T Long Distance network.
- The Lucent 5ESS, a class-5 switching system, is sometimes used as a class-4 switch (or as a mixed class-4/5 switch) in markets that are too small to justify a 4ESS switch.
- The Nortel DMS-250, a larger variant of the DMS-100, is a popular competitor to Lucent's 4ESS, especially among telephone companies that were not previously a part of AT&T. Other DMS switches can also be used as tandems.
- The Nortel SP1 4-Wire was an early electronic switch used as a class-4 switch.

Other class-5 digital switches are often used as class-4 switches for smaller applications.

== See also ==
- Destination routing
- PSTN network topology
- Toll switching trunk
- Trunk vs Toll
