= Subscriber trunk dialling =

Telecommunications technology and telephone numbering system

Subscriber trunk dialling (STD), also known as subscriber toll dialing, is a telephone numbering plan feature and telecommunications technology in the United Kingdom and various Commonwealth countries for the dialling of trunk calls by telephone subscribers without the assistance of switchboard operators.

Switching systems to enable automatic dialling of long distance calls by subscribers were introduced in the United Kingdom on 5 December 1958, using destination codes that were based on the letters in a town's name. A ceremonial first call was made by Queen Elizabeth II from Bristol to Edinburgh.

A similar service, built on crossbar equipment, using regionally structured numbering rather than alphanumeric codes, was experimentally introduced by P&T in Ireland in 1957, with the first services being in Athlone. A full service was rolled out in 1958, initially to exchanges in Cork and then Dublin and its hinterland, and gradually to all areas with automatic exchanges.

The term 'STD call' was once commonly used in the UK, Ireland, Australia, India, and parts of Southeast Asia, but it may be considered archaic today, or possibly even no longer be understood. Other less technical terms like 'national calling,' 'long distance calling' and so on are now more commonly used. The distinction between local and long distance / STD calls is also no longer relevant to many users, as calls are charged at flat or bundled rates. It is also necessary to dial area codes on some calls, especially from mobile phones, so they are considered part of the number.

Terms such as 'area code', 'prefix' or 'national dialling code' tend to be used in place of 'STD code' in the UK and in Ireland.

== History ==
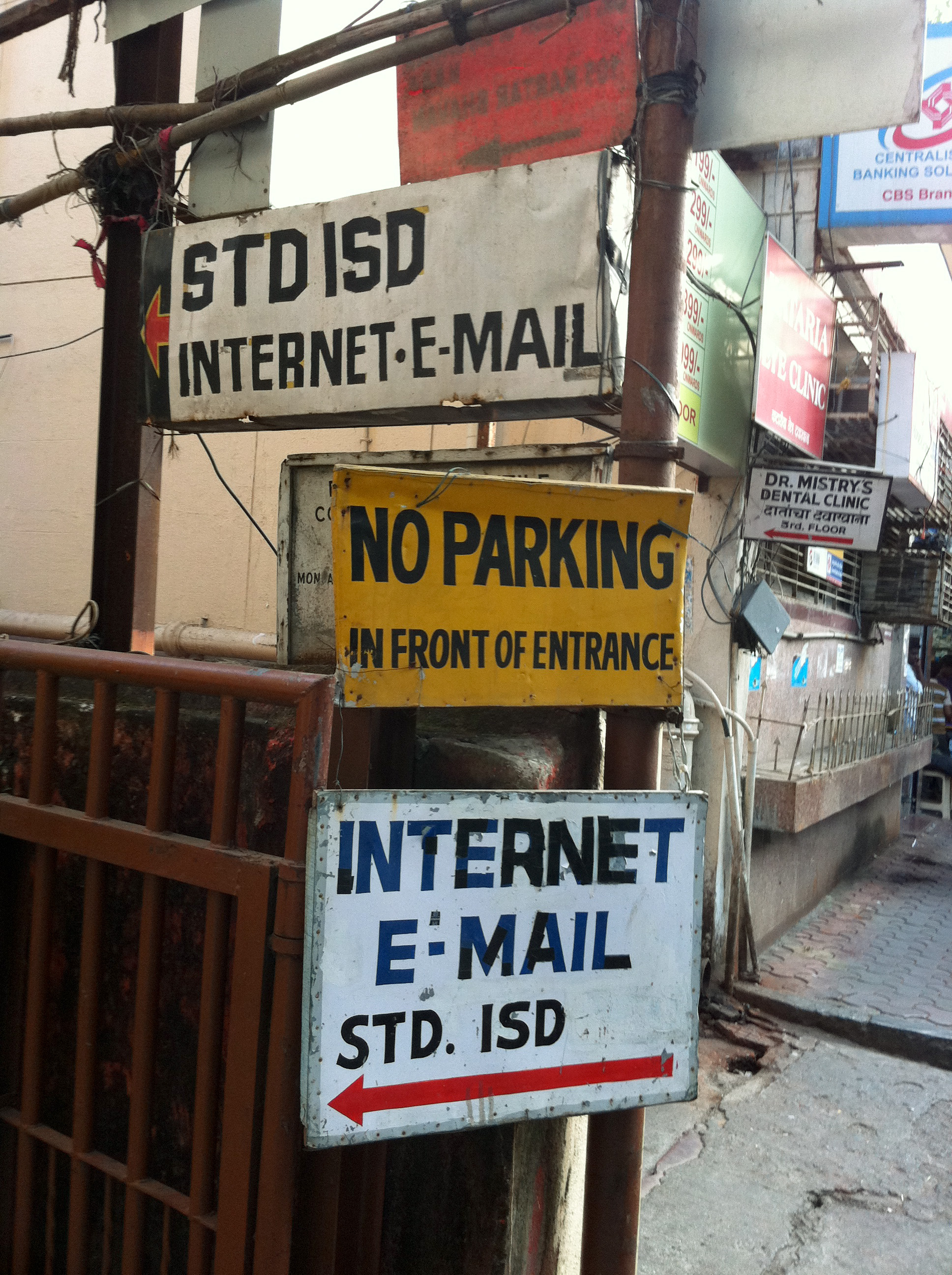
Signboards of old STD booths (kiosks from which STD calls could be made) in India

In the first half of the 20th century, telecommunication services developed progressively from completely manual setup of calls by operators called by subscribers, to automatic systems that could connect subscribers of the same local exchange through the use of telephone dials installed in each telephone.

In the 1940s, the Bell System in the United States and Canada developed methods and technologies, called direct distance dialing and first implemented in 1951, that enabled telephone subscriber to dial long-distance telephone calls themselves without the assistance of an operator. In the United Kingdom, a similar technology called subscriber trunk dialling (STD) was ready by 1958, when Queen Elizabeth II, who was in Bristol, publicised STD by dialling Edinburgh, the farthest distance a call could be directly dialled in the UK, on 5 December 1958. The STD system was completed in 1979.

The technology was extended when, from 8 March 1963, subscribers in London were able to directly dial Paris using international direct dialling.

The term subscriber trunk dialling was used in the United Kingdom, the Republic of Ireland, Australia, India and South East Asia. In the UK, the term is obsolete and area codes are now known as dialling codes.

The introduction in the UK of subscriber dialling of long-distance calls removed the distinction that had existed between trunk and toll calls. This term however, is still widely prevalent in India to describe any national call made outside one's local unit. A "subscriber" is someone who subscribes to, i.e., rents, a telephone line, and a "trunk call" is one made over a trunk line, i.e., a telephone line connecting two exchanges a long distance apart. Since all calls may be dialled direct today, the term has fallen into disuse.

=== Numbering plan ===
In subscriber trunk dialling, each designated region of a country is identified by a unique numerical code (the STD code) that must be dialled as a prefix to each telephone number when placing calls.

Each city with a director system was assigned a three-digit code, in which the second digit corresponded to the first letter of the city name on the telephone dial, except London which had the two-digit code 01. Codes were later changed (e.g., London became 020, and Manchester 0161).

- 01 London
- 021 Birmingham
- 031 Edinburgh
- 041 Glasgow
- 051 Liverpool
- 061 Manchester

=== Calls between the UK and Ireland ===
Because of the high volume of calls between Ireland and the UK, international direct dialling was implemented before the formal introduction of International Subscriber Dialling. Calls were processed through the domestic STD networks and passed between the two networks as trunk traffic, without the need for international gateway exchanges.

==== From the Republic of Ireland ====
Calls to Northern Ireland were made by dialling 08 and the Northern Irish STD code, for example Belfast was reached by dialling 08 0232.

Calls to Britain were made by dialling 03 and the British STD code, e.g., 03 0222 XXX XXX or 03 061 XXX YYYY.

Calls to cities with director area codes could also still be made with the following codes; this was an older arrangement but the numbering remained in service until the 03 code was closed:

- 031 London
- 032 Birmingham
- 033 Edinburgh
- 034 Glasgow
- 035 Liverpool
- 036 Manchester
- Calls to Belfast could also be dialled with 084 and the local six-digit number. Belfast was not a director area.

In 1992, the Republic of Ireland adopted the harmonised European international access code 00, replacing the 16 prefix for international calls and the legacy arrangements for calling Britain. From that year, calls were made in the standard international format, i.e. 0044, and the 03 range was withdrawn from use.

Calls to Northern Ireland are now made by dialling 048 and the eight-digit local number, omitting the 028 STD code. This ensures calls are charged at lower rates. Alternatively, the full international code +44 28 can be used.

==== Calls to Ireland from the UK ====
These were dialled using the full international code 010 353, or using legacy short codes. Examples were:

- Dublin 0001
- Cork 0002
- Limerick 0006
- Galway 0009

These legacy codes dialled directly into Irish cities that had crossbar switching in the 1950s and 1960s, and predated the introduction of ISD in the UK. The Irish STD system evolved around the introduction of LM Ericsson ARM and ITT Pentaconta crossbar trunk/tandem switches, and did not use the UK's director approach. While these calls were international, they were processed within the UK STD infrastructure, without passing through an international gateway exchange.

Calls to Ireland are now made in the standard international format +353 (or 00 353) and special codes are no longer used.

== See also ==
- Trunk prefix
- Telephone numbers in the United Kingdom
- Telephone numbers in the Republic of Ireland
- Telephone numbers in India
- Telephone numbers in Australia
- Telephone numbers in New Zealand
- List of country calling codes
