= Remote concentrator =

In modern telephony a remote concentrator, remote concentrator unit (RCU), or remote line concentrator (RLC) is a concentrator at the lowest level in the telephone switch hierarchy.

Subscribers' analogue telephone/PSTN lines are terminated on concentrators. They have three main functions:

- Digitize: convert voice (and sometimes data) from analogue to a digital form.
- Connect off-hook lines to the local exchange—the concentration function.
- Multiplex, interleaving many calls together on a single wire or optical fiber.

Only a few hundred telephone lines attach to each remote concentrator. In North America concentrators are located in a serving area interface (SAI) or other enclosure in each neighborhood. In Europe the buildings which once contained local Strowger switch telephone exchanges are now usually empty except for a remote concentrator.

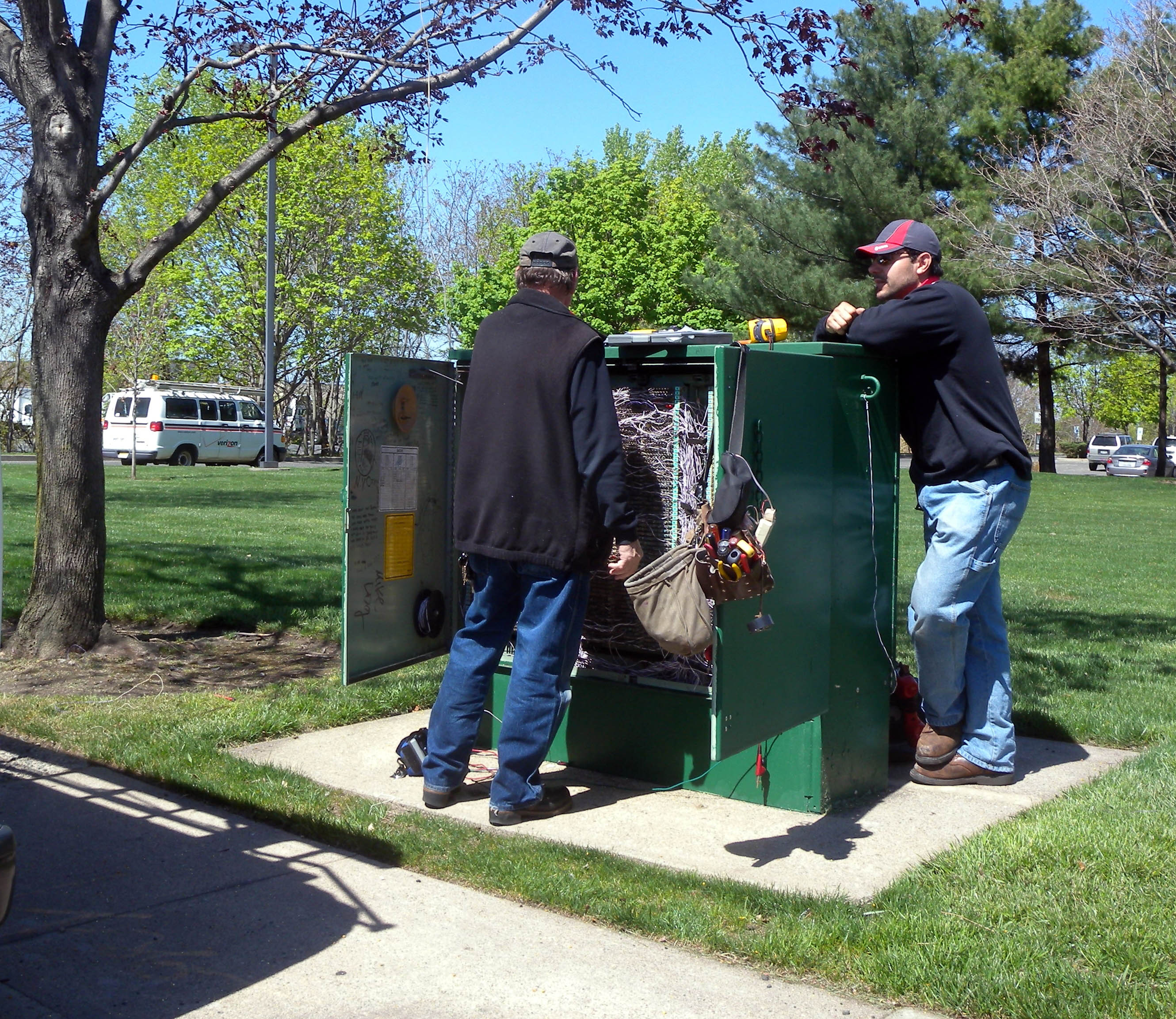
This Verizon Communications SAI in New Jersey may contain a concentrator.

Only call packets from or destined to a phone serviced by the concentrator actually are processed by the concentrator; nonlocal phones' time slots just pass through the concentrator unchanged. If the concentrator malfunctions, a fail-safe relay connects the "in" wires to the "out" wires, and nonlocal phones detect no difference. The central switch periodically counts concentrators, and schedules maintenance, probably before users notice the failure. Concentrators for several hundred customers can be threaded on this loop like pearls.

The interface between remote concentrators and their parent telephone switches has been standardised by ETSI as the V5 interface.

== Operation ==
When a user picks up their phone, the concentrator produces the dial tone. When the user dials, it reads the tones. Once the user has completed dialing, the concentrator's microcomputer sends the dialing data to the central switch, which allocates a time slot for the dialing phone on the wire pairs that pass through the concentrator and through the switch.

After the central switch tells the concentrator which time slot to use, the concentrator "opens" a time-slot on the loop to a local phone. The allocated time slot on the wiring into the concentrator is used to send data from the remote telephone's microphone to the local telephone's speaker. The allocated time slot on the wiring out of the concentrator (with the same time slot number) carries data from the local microphone to the remote speaker.

To arrange a connection, the switch just completes the circle between the user's phone and the remote phone. It interchanges the data from one to the other. In this limited sense, telephone "exchange" is exactly correct terminology.

== Technology implications ==
Having a concentrator near a subscriber's telephone results in very low signal degradation before the analog signal is digitized. This provides reliably good voice quality.

Concentrators are often placed alongside a digital subscriber line access multiplexer (DSLAM). This can provide access to asymmetric digital subscriber line (ADSL) Internet service for subscribers who are beyond the normal 4 kilometres (2.5 mi) signaling limit on a copper wire loop. For example, a fiber optic cable might run up to 30 kilometres (19 mi) without a repeater from the telephone exchange to a concentrator site, and local subscriber wire local loops can extend an additional 4 km beyond the concentrator and its DSLAM. With repeaters in the fiber optic cable the distance from the telephone exchange can be extended much farther.

== See also ==
- Remote digital terminal
- Distributed switching
- Pair gain
- Access network
