= Jim Warman =

English electrical engineer (1924–1984)

- Warman with his wife Pat at Buckingham Palace receiving the Prince Philip Medal in 1966
- Born: Bloomfield James Warman; 25 July 1924; Westcombe Park, London, England
- Died: 21 November 1984 (aged 60); England
- Occupation: Electrical engineer
- Spouse: Pat

Bloomfield James Warman (25 July 1924 – 21 November 1984) was an English electrical engineer. He was involved with the design of electronic telephone exchanges in the 1960s and 1970s.

Warman was responsible for the concept of both the TXE1 and TXE3 systems, which were reed switch-based electronic exchanges. The development of these exchanges was carried out by a consortium of British telecom manufacturers in conjunction with the General Post Office. The ideas in these exchanges were later developed, by others, into the TXE4 exchanges – which, at their peak in the early 1990s, catered for more than 25% of the UK subscribers.

== Biography ==
Bloomfield James Warman was born on 25 July 1924 in Westcombe Park in Southeast London, England. During World War II he served in the Royal Electrical and Mechanical Engineers.

His career started off Siemens Brothers at Woolwich, and he remained there when Associated Electrical Industries (AEI) took over the company. AEI was then taken over by the General Electric Company, who, in 1968, closed down the development of TXE exchanges in favour of crossbar switch systems. All the AEI staff were sacked, including those on the TXE project. Warman joined American company GTE International as European technical director based in Milan, taking with him some members of his AEI team. There, Warman persisted in basing his developments on reed electronic (analogue) principles, when it had already become clear that fully electronic digital switches were now the obvious path forward. Some time later, GTE decided to close the development team in Europe.

Warman received the Prince Philip Medal of the City and Guilds Institute in 1966. He held over 100 patents.

He returned to the UK and set up his own company, but it was not a success, and his health failed. He died in November 1984.
