= Reed switch =

Electrical switch operated by an applied magnetic field

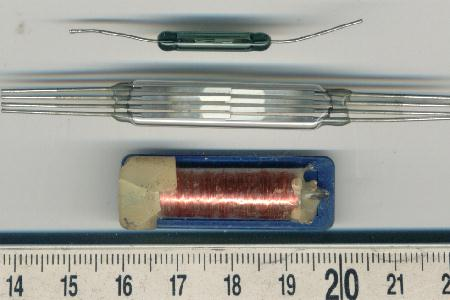
(from top) Single-pole reed switch, four-pole reed switch and single-pole reed relay. Scale in centimeters.

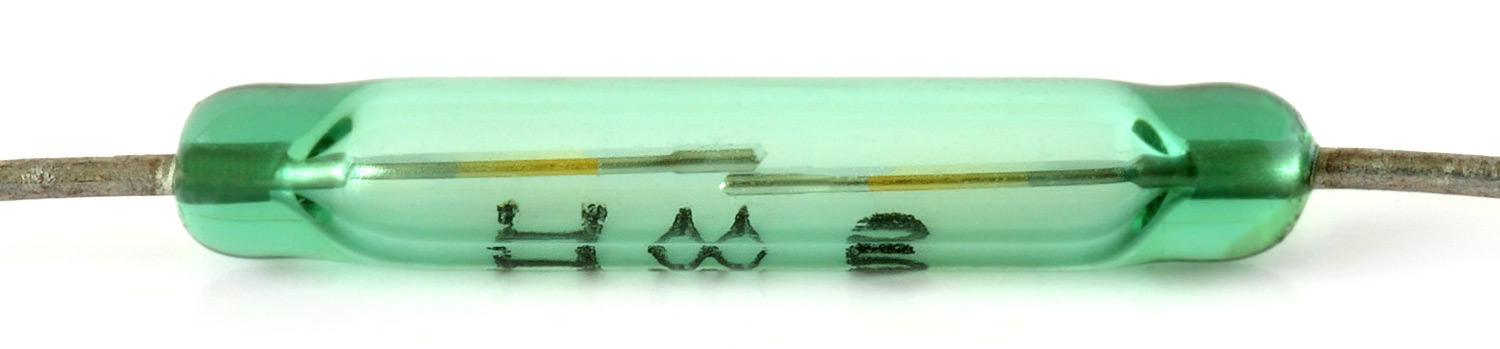
Reed switch, contact detail.

Commonly-used circuit symbol

Operation of the reed switch

The reed switch (Note: Historically, Herkon switch was occasionally used as synonym for reed switch or reed contact. "Herkon" was a SEL/ITT trademark standing for "hermetically sealed contact".) is an electromechanical switch operated by an applied magnetic field. It was invented in 1922 by professor Valentin Kovalenkov at the Petrograd Electrotechnical University, and later evolved at Bell Telephone Laboratories in 1936 by Walter B. Ellwood into the reed relay. In its simplest and most common form, it consists of a pair of ferromagnetic flexible metal contacts in a hermetically sealed glass envelope. The contacts are usually normally open, closing when a magnetic field is present, or they may be normally closed and open when a magnetic field is applied. The switch may be actuated by an electromagnetic coil, making a reed relay, or by bringing a permanent magnet near it. When the magnetic field is removed, the contacts in the reed switch return to their original position. The "reed" is the metal part inside the reed switch envelope that is relatively thin and wide to make it flexible, resembling the reed of a musical instrument. The term "reed" may also include the external wire lead as well as the internal part.

A common example of a reed switch application is to detect the opening of a door or windows, for a security alarm.

== Description ==
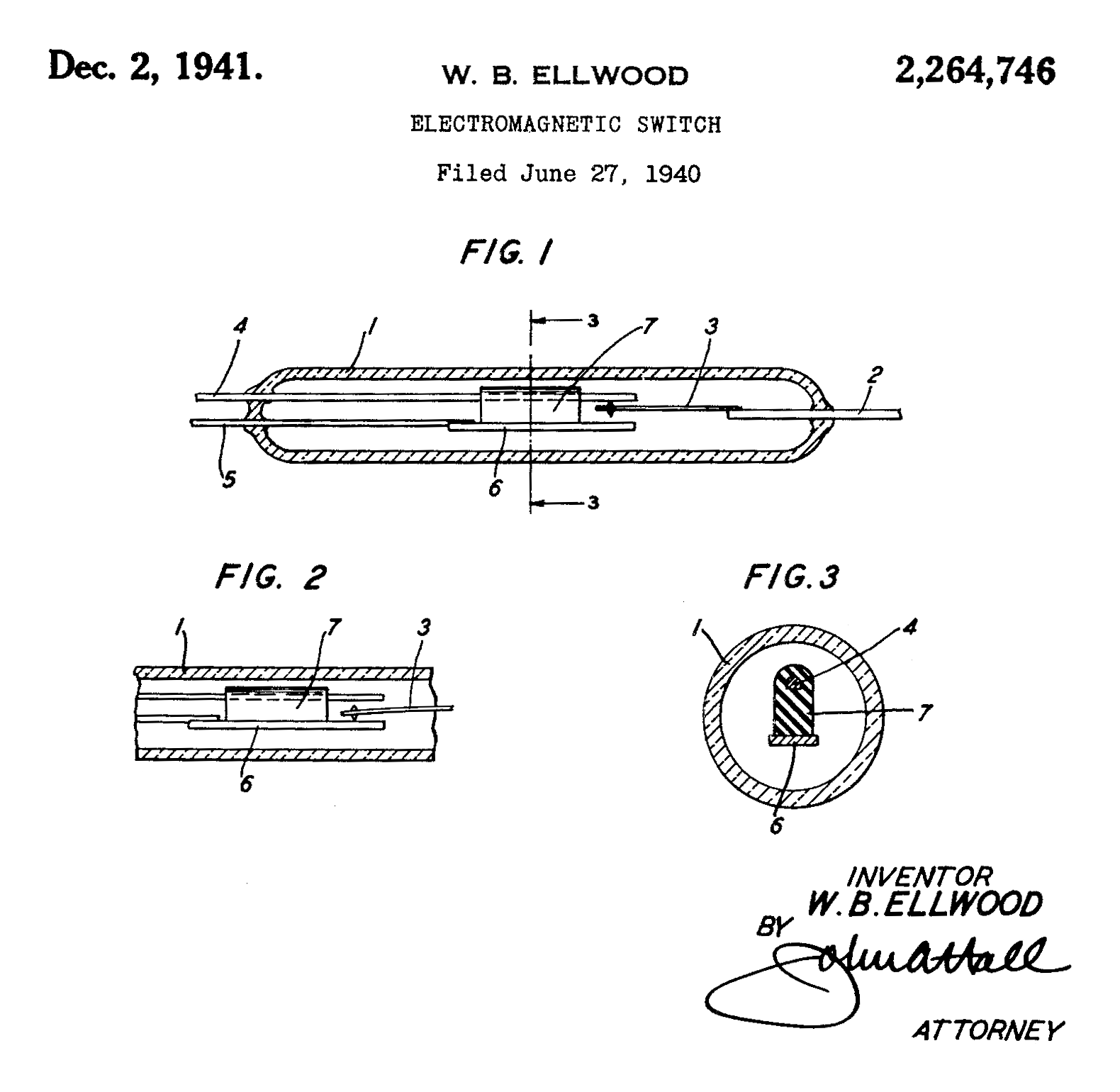
Reed switch diagrams from Walter B. Ellwood's 1941 patent, Electromagnetic switch. It illustrates a single pole, double-throw (SPDT) device. Descriptions from the patent text are as follows: Fig. 1 - device shown in nonoperated position Fig. 2 - device shown in operated position Fig. 3 - cross-section 1 - glass envelope 2 - terminal 3 - resilient magnetic member 4 - non-magnetic member 5 - conducting member 6 - magnetic member 7 - insulating piece

The most common type of reed switch contains a pair of magnetizable, flexible, metal reeds whose end portions are separated by a small gap when the switch is open. The reeds are hermetically sealed within a tubular glass envelope. Another type of reed switch contains one flexible reed that moves between a fixed normally-open contact and a fixed normally-closed contact. The normally-closed contact is non-ferromagnetic and is closed by the flexible reed's spring force. Although reed switches with multiple poles are possible, more often an assembly of single-pole reed switches is used for multi-pole applications.

A magnetic field from an electromagnet or a permanent magnet will cause the reeds to attract each other, thus completing an electrical circuit. The spring force of the reeds causes them to separate, and open the circuit, when the magnetic field ceases. Another configuration contains a non-ferromagnetic normally-closed contact that opens when the ferromagnetic normally-open contact closes. A thin layer of non-ferromagnetic material is applied to the reed switch contact area to serve as an electrical contact switching (wear) surface and, for normally-open contacts, as a magnetic spacer whose thickness is important in controlling the magnetic field level at which the contact opens (the drop-out). Reed switch contacts are typically rhodium, ruthenium, iridium, or tungsten. There are also versions of reed switches with mercury-wetted contacts. Such switches must be mounted in a particular orientation, lest drops of mercury bridge the contacts even when not activated.

Since the contacts of the reed switch are sealed away from the atmosphere, they are protected against atmospheric corrosion. The hermetic sealing of a reed switch make them suitable for use in explosive atmospheres where tiny sparks from conventional switches would constitute a hazard.

One important quality of the switch is its sensitivity, the amount of magnetic field necessary to actuate it. Sensitivity is measured in units of ampere-turns (AT), corresponding to the current in a test coil multiplied by the number of turns in the test coil. Typical pull-in sensitivities for commercial devices are in the 10 to 60 AT range. The lower the AT, the more sensitive the reed switch. Smaller reed switches, which have smaller parts, are generally more sensitive to magnetic fields.

In production, a metal reed is inserted in each end of a glass tube and the ends of the tube are heated so that they seal around a shank portion on the reeds. Green-colored infrared-absorbing glass is frequently used, so an infrared heat source can concentrate the heat in the small sealing zone of the glass tube. The thermal coefficient of expansion of the glass material and metal parts must be similar to prevent breaking the glass-to-metal seal. The glass used must have a high electrical resistance and must not contain volatile components, such as lead oxide and fluorides, which can contaminate the contacts during the sealing operation. The leads of the switch must be handled carefully to prevent breaking the glass envelope. The glass envelope can be damaged if the reed switch is subjected to mechanical stress.

Most reed switches are filled with nitrogen at atmospheric pressure. After the final seal is made, the switch cools and the internal pressure is less than one atmosphere. Reed switches sealed with a pressurized nitrogen atmosphere have a higher breakdown voltage and are useful for switching 220–240 VAC mains power. Reed switches with a vacuum inside the glass envelope can switch thousands of volts.

Reed switches can be used to directly switch a variety of loads ranging from nanovolts to kilovolts, femtoamperes to amperes, and DC to radio frequency. Other magnetically-activated switching devices have a limited range of output voltages and currents, and generally do not directly control a final device such as a lamp, solenoid, or motor.

Reed switches have small leakage currents compared to solid state devices; this may be useful, for example, in medical devices requiring protection of a patient from tiny leakage currents. The reed is hermetically sealed and can therefore operate in almost any environment, such as where flammable gas is present or where corrosion would affect open switch contacts. A reed switch has very low resistance when closed, typically as low as 0.05 ohms, whereas the Hall-effect sensors can be in the hundreds of ohms. A reed switch requires only two wires whereas most solid-state devices require three wires. A reed switch can be said to require zero power to operate it.

== Uses ==
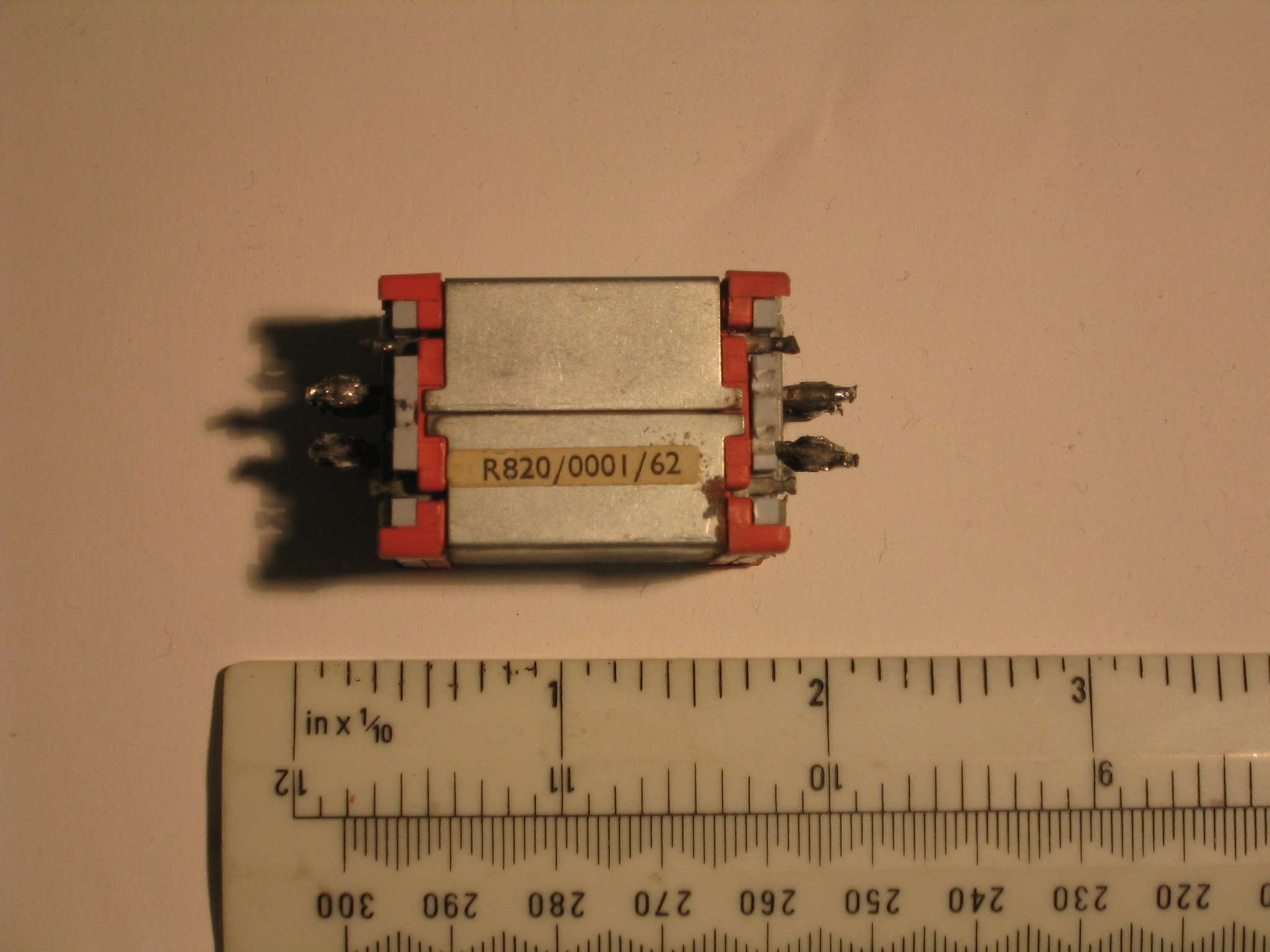
A reed relay from a TXE-3 telephone exchange

=== Reed relays ===
One or more reed switches inside an electromagnetic coil constitute a reed relay. Reed relays are used when operating currents are relatively low, and offer high operating speed, good performance with very small currents that are not reliably switched by conventional contacts, high reliability and long life. Millions of reed relays were used in telephone exchanges in the 1970s and 1980s. In particular, they were used for switching in the British TXE family of telephone exchanges. The inert atmosphere around the reed contacts ensures that oxidation will not affect the contact resistance. Mercury-wetted reed relays are sometimes used, especially in high-speed counting circuits.

=== Magnetic sensors ===
Reed switches actuated by magnets are commonly used in mechanical systems as proximity sensors. Examples are door and window sensors in burglar alarm systems and tamperproofing methods. Reed switches have been used in laptops to put the laptop into sleep/hibernation mode when the lid is closed. Speed sensors on bicycle wheels frequently use a reed switch to actuate briefly each time a magnet on the wheel passes the sensor.

At one time brushless DC electric motors used reed switches to sense the rotor's position relative to the field poles. This allowed switching transistors to act as a commutator, but without the contact problems, wear and electrical noise of a traditional DC commutator. The motor design could also be "inverted", placing permanent magnets onto the rotor and switching the field through the external, fixed coils. This avoided the need for any rubbing contact to provide power to the rotor. Such motors were used in low-power long-service-life items, such as computer cooling fans and disk drives. As cheap Hall-effect sensors became available, they replaced the reed switches and gave even longer service lifetimes.

Reed switches are used in at least one brand of endoscopic capsule to switch on the power source only when the unit is removed from the sterile packaging.

Reed switches may be selected for a particular sensor application when a solid-state device does not meet requirements such as power consumption or electrical interface compatibility.

==== Keyboard switches ====
External videos
- Maxi Switch magnetic reed keyboards with original SA keycaps! (Maxi Switch magnetic reed)

Reed switches were formerly used in the keyboards for computer terminals, where each key had a magnet and a reed switch actuated by depressing the key. Reed switches in keyboards have largely been superseded by Hall-effect switches.

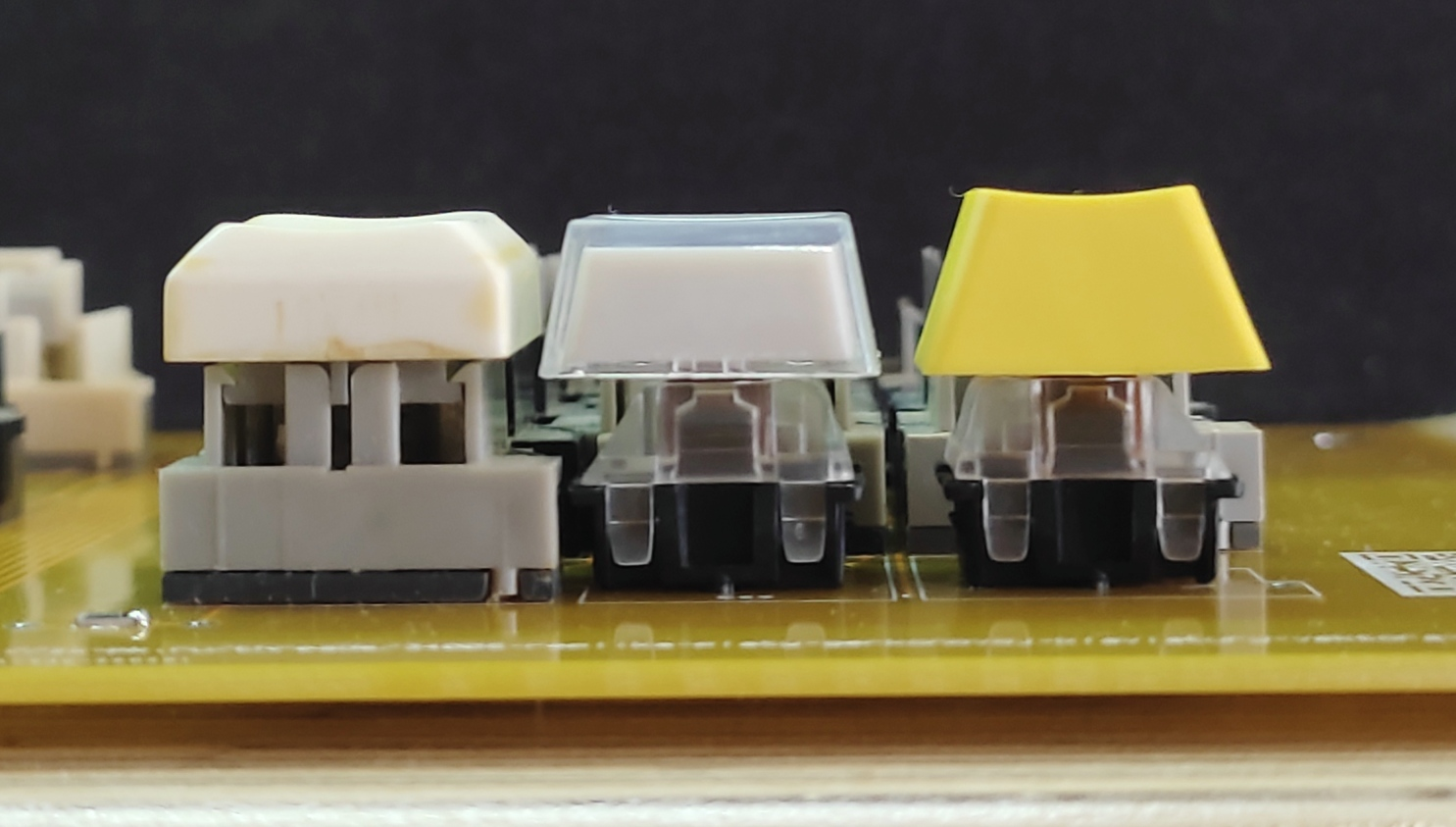
PKM 1B (left) next to Cherry MX

Electric and electronic pedal keyboards used by pipe organ and Hammond organ players often use reed switches, where the glass enclosure of the contacts protects them from dirt, dust, and other particles. They may also be used to control diving equipment, such as flashlights or cameras, which must be sealed to keep water out under high pressure.

== Life ==
The mechanical motion of the reeds is below the fatigue limit of the materials, so the reeds do not break due to fatigue. Wear and life are almost entirely dependent on the electrical circuit's effect on the contacts along with the properties of the specific reed switch used. Contact surface wear occurs only when the switch contacts open or close. Because of this, manufacturers rate life in number of operations rather than hours or years. In general, higher voltages and higher currents cause faster wear and shorter life. Depending on the electrical load, life can be in the range of thousands of operations or billions of operations.

== See also ==
- List of sensors
