= Robik =

ZX Spectrum clone

- Robic logo

- Also known as: Арифметико-Логическое Устройство «Робик»
- Developer: NPO "Rotor"
- Manufacturer: NPO "Rotor", SELTO-Micron-Service, SELTO-Complect
- Product family: ZX Spectrum 48K
- Type: Home computer
- Generation: 4th
- Released: July 1989; 37 years ago
- Introductory price: $420 / Rbls 760 (WSP: Rbls 649)
- Discontinued: January 1998; 28 years ago
- Units shipped: 73 904
- Operating system: Sinclair BASIC
- CPU: Z80A clone
- Memory: 48KB
- Removable storage: Cassette tape or diskette
- Display: Analog RGB or digital TTL monitors; 256×192
- Sound: Beeper
- Input: Kempston Joysticks
- Power: 20 VA (9V)
- Current firmware: V03
- Dimensions: 420 × 170 × 66mm (16.5 × 6.7 × 2.6 in.)
- Weight: 1.9 kg (4.2 lbs) [+external power supply up to 0.5 kg (1.1 lbs)]
- Marketing target: business, schools, entertainment, home computer
- Backward compatibility: ZX Spectrum
- Language: English, Russian

ALU Robik (Russian: Арифметико-Логическое Устройство «Робик», lit. 'Arithmetic Logic Unit «Robik»') was a Soviet and Ukrainian ZX Spectrum clone produced between July 1989 and January 1998 by the NPO "Rotor" in Cherkasy. Over 70 000 was produced, while few millions was planned.

== Specification ==
The Robik is a monoblock computer in the keyboard formfactor, with an external power supply block, permanently connected by wire.

Older cases produced by the SELTO, and newer produced by the NPO "Rotor" (on the back side of keyboard case there is a logo of manufacturer).

=== Motherboard ===
It came in four versions, with only minor changes made for Russian internationalization and localization. The hardware remained largely unchanged, but cheaper parts were used for each version. The fourth version had the new addition of a single integrated circuit. This version did not sell well because by then the main market for the Robik was hardware enthusiasts and this design did not allow for modifications.

Robik had two EPROM chips. There are two languages in the M2764AF-1 chip from ST, which can be switched by shortcut keys.

=== Keyboard ===
The computer came with 55 keys,. It had the possibility to switch between Latin and Russian fonts.

- A total of 55 keys in the main group:
  - Two RES ("Reset" keys), DEL ("Delete"), EXIT, ↵ Enter;
  - Full English/Russian (QWERTY/ЙЦУКЕН) keyboard;
  - Two ⇧ Shift, and in some variants;
  - , and . stop keys;
  - ⌖ ("Fire" key), MF ("Multifunctional" key, in some variants changed to third one ⇧ Shift), Space;
  - C ("CAPS C") and L ("CAPS L") keys.
- Four keys in a separate group (on the right, next to main group) — cursor keys (together with "Fire" key it also worked as a joystick).

The letters on switches caps were written using laser beam technology, as a result labels represented as outlined symbols (in the last version stamp printing used for place labels as filled symbols instead).

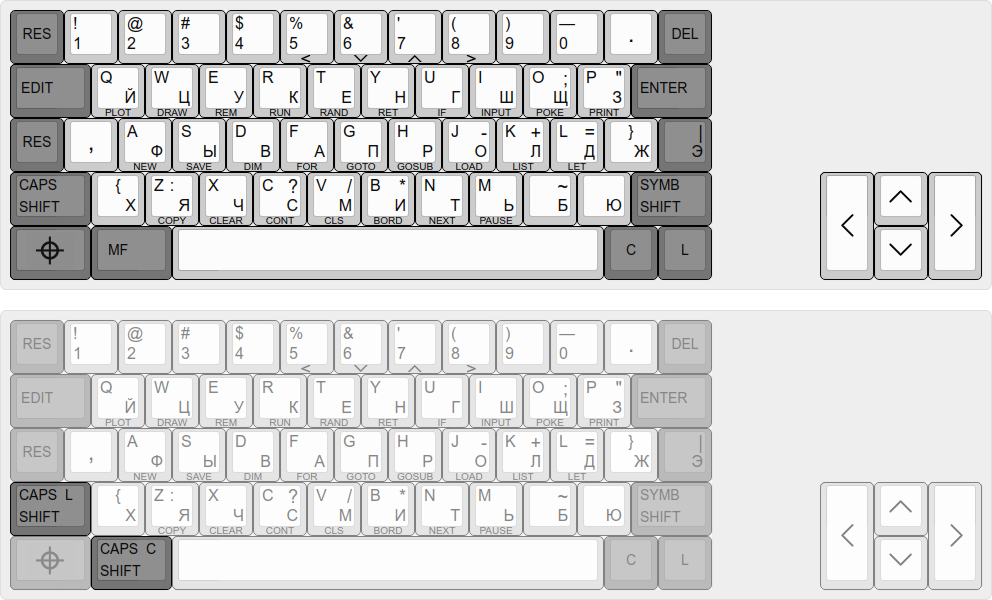
The Robik keyboard layout variants

==== PKM 1B ====
The keyboard buttons are based on the PKM 1B (Russian: ПКМ 1Б, lit. 'magnetic keyboard switch') reed switches, instead of copper or iron contact plates.

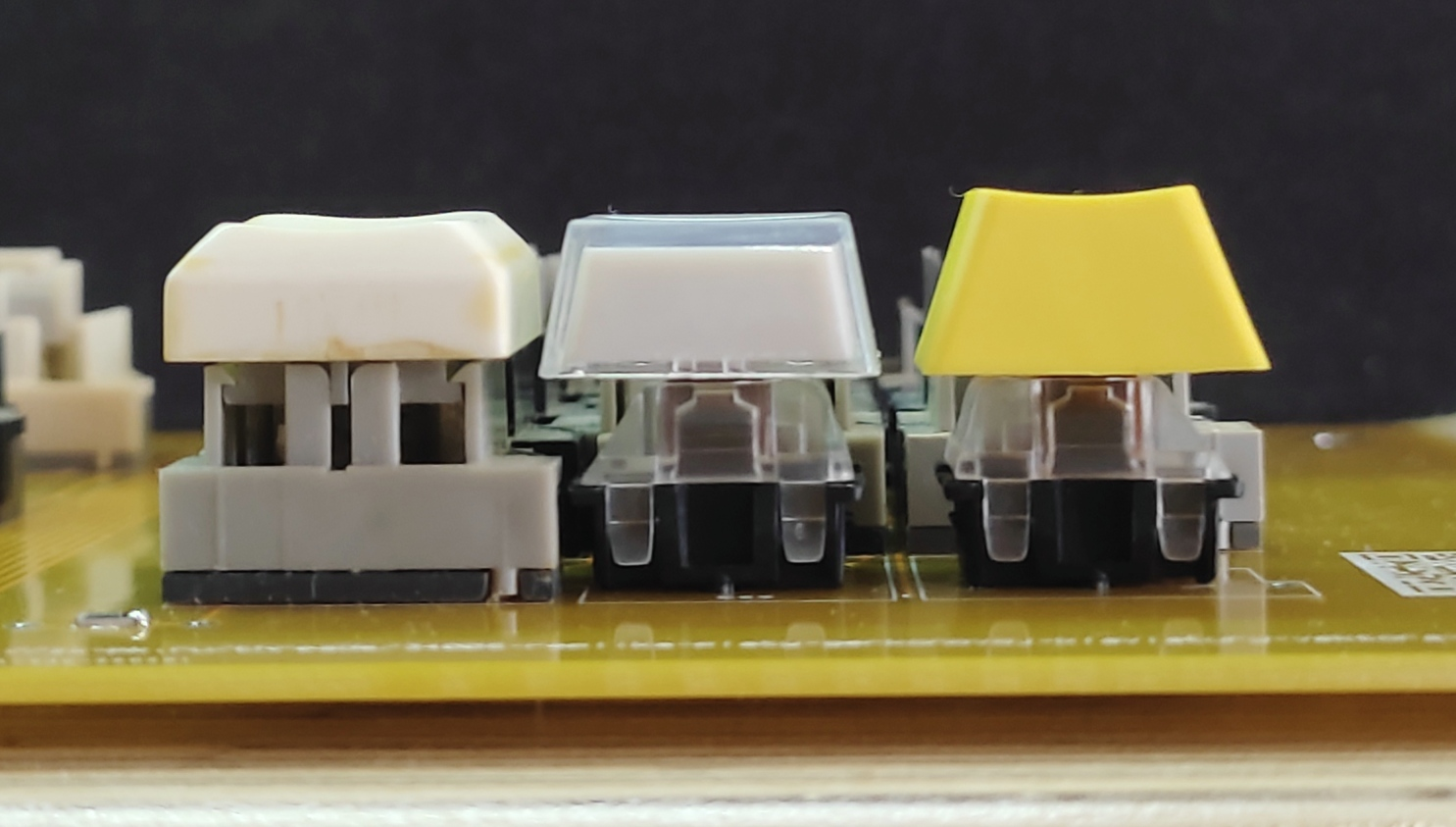
PKM 1B (on the left) next to Cherry MX switches

Initially, the PKM 1B switches produced by the EMZ "Magnit" (Ukraine) was used, but original production of switches discontinued during the production of the Robik, and the NPO "Rotor" launched its own production line for the PKM 1B switches instead.

=== Peripherals ===
The Robik had four ports on the back side: ВИДЕО ("Video"), RGB, JS-K, ◯_◯ ("Tape"). It had no edge connector and video output was analog RGB on a 5-pin DIN or digital TTL on an 8-pin DIN.

Inside the case there was a male 64-pin connector that could be mapped to the standard edge connector.

==== Display ====
The Robick supports to be connected to either monochrome MDA/Hercules or color EGA monitor (via ВИДЕО out), or color TV (via RGB out). For the RGB out, there are adjusters for each of color channel (R, G and B), as well as overall color invertor toggle – all are accessible via the marked access holles on the bottom side of computer.

There was no composite video and all I/O ports were 5- and 7-pin DINs.

When writing, the screen memory to the TV/monitor screen did not begin from the top left of the border, but instead began from border right under paper. This meant that most multicolor effects and some games did not work correctly. Errors in the ROM have been fixed and Cyrillic letters were also inserted.

The keyboard matrix was extended from five keys in eight rows to five keys in nine rows to allow for more buttons. A reset could be performed by pressing two RES buttons.

==== Sound ====
NPO "Rotor" produced an external music sound device for the Robik.

==== External storage ====
Robik has no internal mass storage and uses cassette tapes as an external storage.

It requires to connect cassette deck via ◯_◯ ("Tape") port, for read and write data.

There was also an external floppy disk drive produced for the Robik by NPO "Rotor", to use diskettes instead of tapes.

==== Joystick ====
There is the JS-K port for connecting joysticks via Kempston Interface.

==== Printer ====
Printer has been developed for the Robik by NPO "Rotor".

== Software ==
The Robik distribution includes a cassette tape with seven programs:

1. "BASICTEST" (computer testing and debugging application)
2. "DEVPAC" (compiler/decompiler/debugger)
3. "RED" (text editor)
4. "KRACOUT" (video game)
5. "ART-STUDIO" (raster image editor)
6. "IS CHESS-48" (chess video game)
7. "BAT"

== Legacy ==
External images
- Robik in the Software and Computer Museum
- Robik in The Home Computer Museum
- Robik in the Ust'-Kamenogorsk Computer Museum
- Startup screen (Robik screenshot)
- SELTO logo (on the case bottom side)
- NPO "Rotor" logo (on the case bottom side)

There is a number of the Robik computers stored in various museums and private collections around the world:

- Software and Computer Museum, Kyiv and Kharkiv (Ukraine)
- Museum of Computer Technology of the University of Lviv (Ukraine)
- The It8bit.Club Museum of Retro Computers, Mariupol (Ukraine). Museum was fully destroyed in March 2022, in a result of shelling by Russians during the Battle of Mariupol (website continue to exists as a virtual museum now)
- Ust'-Kamenogorsk Computer Museum (Kazakhstan)
- The Peek & Poke Computer Museum, Rijeka (Croatia)
- Le musée de l'informatique Silicium, Corbarieu (France)
- Kompjutry.cz, moving computer museum (Czechia)
- The Home Computer Museum, Oberhausen (Germany)
- The Number Crunchers Homecomputer Museum (Germany)
- The Freeman PC Museum, Long Beach (California, USA)
- Rhode Island Computer Museum, Warwick (Rhode Island, USA)
- Arcade Vintage Museum (Spanish: Museo del Videojuego Arcade Vintage), Ibi (Spain)
- Reale-Rydell Computer Museum, virtual museum
- Hal's friends Computer Museum, virtual museum (Italy)
- Osmibitóve muzeum, virtual museum (Chechia)
- The Clueless Engineer, vlogger (Australia)
- Personal Computer Museum, Ontario (Canada)

У 2017, the "LandauCenter" at the National University of Kharkiv organized an exhibition of the 1980s computers. Exposition included the Robik from the Software and Computer Museum collection.

Since the end of production, there are a lot of the Robik computers present on the secondary market.

== Facts ==
- On 22 May 1993, on the cover of the printed addition to one of the local magazines in Kryvyi Rih (Ukraine) was placed the next classified advert:
  [Proposing] a software for computers the «Robik», the «Master» and others. (the Spectrum)
  — Tel.**-**-**, ПРОПОНУЮТЬ, Ярмарка (Специальный выпуск). (PDF) — Криворожские Ведомости, 22 May 1993. — 20(76)/9: 1.
- Local schools was gifted with hundreds of the Robik computers by NPO "Rotor" for free.
- The hardware contained about three to four grams of gold and almost eighteen grams of silver, and some of other rare metals are present in various electronic components used in the Robik. As a result, many of the Robik computers have been dismantled for recovery of the costly parts.

== See also ==
- List of ZX Spectrum clones

== Publications ==
- Documents from the NPO «Rotor» archives, published in the «Legends of Bytes», Issue 10 (2024).
- Demidenko, Gennadiy (May 2024). "Історія та статистика побутового комп'ютера "Робік"" [The History and Statistic of the Robik home computer]. Legends of Bytes (in Ukrainian) (10). Cherkasy: G. Demidenko: 30–101. Archived from the original on 15 September 2024.
- Устройство арифметико-логическое РОБИК [Arithmetic Logic Unit "Robik"] (PDF) (Usage Manual) (in Russian). Cherkasy: NPO Rotor. 1992. Archived from the original on 15 September 2024.
- АЛП "Робик" [ALP "Robik"] (Circuit diagram) (DjVu)
- Боровик, О.С.; Парфенов, А.В.; Сьірямкин, В.И. (1992). Сьірямкин, В.И. (ed.). Увлекательньіе игрьі на бьітовом компьютере [Enjoying Games on Home Computer] (in Russian). Томск: МГП "РАСКО". p. 20. ISBN 5-256-00987-7. "Начат вьіпуск нескольких серийньіх моделей "Магик", "Компаньон", "Робик" и др." [Started the serial production of the few models of the "Magik", "Companion", "Robik" and others.]
- "схема 4 мб "SPECTRUM"!! Модернизация компьютера "РОБИК"" [shematic 4 MB "SPECTRUM"!! Modernizing the "ROBIK" computer]. Faultless (in Russian) (8). 29 November 1997. Archived from the original (ZIP) on 11 September 2019.
- Z.M. "ROBIK — ZX Spectrum born again?!". polbox.com. Archived from the original on 3 December 1998. "There was a copy (not only one...) of ZX Spectrum designed in the Czerkasy city. It was called 'Robik'."
- Cazorla, Emilio Florido (30 September 2009). "Los clones del ZX Spectrum" [Клони ZX Spectrum] (PDF). ZX Spectrum Files (in Portuguese) (9). Sevilla: 16–24.
- "Send in the clones: A comprehensive guide to all Speccy clones" (PDF). Z88 USER & AlchNews (7 & 33): 22–29.
- Mokosiy, Vitaliy (14 September 2018). "My story of Robik". Medium.
- "PAL-Coder на CXA1645M. Подключаем клон ZX-Spectrum к телевизору" [PAL-Coder using CXA1645M. Connecting ZX-Spectrum clone to TV]. village-radiolab.com (in Russian). 22 August 2022.

=== Video ===
- The Clueless Engineer. Робик (Robik) playlist on YouTube
- Bazza H. The Robik 48k ZX Spectrum clone. A lovely gift from The Ukraine on YouTube
