= Dimond ring =

Early type of computer memory

A Dimond ring or Dimond ring translator was an early type of computer read-only memory, created in the early 1940s by T. L. Dimond at Bell Laboratories for Bell's #5 Crossbar Switch, a type of early telephone switch.

== Structure ==
Large-diameter magnetic ferrite toroidal rings with solenoid windings, through which are threaded writing and reading wires.

== Uses ==
It was used in the #5 Crossbar Switch and TXE (prior to TXE4A) telephone exchanges.

== See also ==
- Core rope memory, a later development
