= TXE =

Family of British telephone exchanges

TXE (Telephone eXchange Electronic) was a family of telephone exchanges developed by the British General Post Office (GPO), designed to replace the ageing Strowger switches.

When World War II ended, the UK telephone exchange suppliers supported the GPO's decision to stay with Strowger until a viable electronic system became available. The GPO largely did this to protect their success in the export market, but it actually had the effect of ultimately destroying it. This allowed competitors to develop their own improved switching systems ahead of the GPO. In 1960 the situation rapidly changed when the Australian Postmaster-General's Department rejected a system from a consortium of British manufacturers who offered a register-controlled version of a motor-uniselector system in favour of a crossbar system from LM Ericsson. Suddenly the rules had changed and the race was on to develop an electronic telephone exchange that could operate with the current GPO telephones used in the UK, including shared service.

TXE1 Reed Relay

== Introduction ==
Just before World War II Tommy Flowers, employed at the GPO, had been working on VF (voice frequency) signalling, using valves (vacuum tubes), and this had led him to realise that valves could be very reliable if not switched on and off. This gave him the confidence during the war to build the world's first digital computer, called Colossus, at Bletchley Park. After the war, the success of Colossus encouraged him to contemplate the possibility of telephone exchanges each using tens of thousands of valves. He was told that this was impossible and he could not say he had already done it with Colossus because he was bound by the Official Secrets Act. However, a fully electronic prototype Time-Division Multiplex Model Exchange was constructed at the Post Office Research Station at Dollis Hill and then an experimental TDM exchange system was built and tested at Highgate Wood in 1962, but it was found to be beyond the technology of the time: the solid-state switching worked well, but the analogue transmission (which had worked on the short cable runs of a laboratory model at Dollis Hill) was too noisy for public service on the long cable runs of a large exchange. However, the principles would be used later, as transmission became digital, in the development of digital exchanges the world over, including System X.

Siemens Brothers (later taken over by Associated Electrical Industries, who renamed each section accordingly, e.g. AEI Telecoms) had set up an electronic switching lab at Blackheath. This lab was headed by John Flood, who had been a founder member of Tommy Flowers' electronic switching team at Dollis Hill. The Siemens team included an engineer called Jim Warman, whose trunking ideas (sectionalisation, serial trunking, line scanning, route choice, repeat attempt etc.), which were to be central to the development of the British TXE exchanges.

Following the failure to win major contracts in Australia in 1960 and the subsequent failure of Highgate Wood, it was necessary for the British manufacturers to come up with something different until a fully digital system could be developed (which eventually turned out to be System X and System Y). Ericsson had twenty years of experience of manufacturing the crossbar system and reducing its cost, so there was no point in trying to compete with them (Plessey Telecommunications, a subsidiary of Plessey, took a different view and continued to urge the GPO to adopt crossbar). At this time, in the US, Bell Labs were developing a system based on electronically controlled reed relays, and this looked promising. One of Ericsson's marketing points for crossbar was that it used precious-metal contacts, but reed relays would be even better as their precious metal contacts were hermetically sealed. Also their very short operating and release times (<1 ms) made them ideal for electronic control, and these reed-electronic exchanges were considered the most practical switching system to proceed with at the time, and electronic enough until a truly electronic system could be developed; Tommy Flowers did not approve as he advocated going straight to a digital system.

The manager at AEI (W G Patterson) decided that reed-electronic space-division switching was the way to go, and it was then that the term 'TXE' (Telephone eXchange Electronic) was coined, even although the reed relays themselves were not regarded as electronic components.

A much bigger team was needed to undertake the detailed development and AEI persuaded AT&E and STC to join them in the work. The initial result of their work was a prototype system called TXE1.

== TXE1 ==
A TXE1 switching rack capable of dealing with 1,500 subscribers

The TXE1 was developed by three members of the Joint Electronic Research Committee (JERC) which was formed in 1956 and lasted until 1969. The JERC consisted of the GPO, Siemens Brothers (later AEI), Automatic Telephone & Electric (later Plessey), the Ericsson Telephones (also later Plessey), General Electric Company (GEC), and Standard Telephones and Cables (STC). STC built the common control; AEI the switching and scanners, line scanning, and test console; and AT&E the dialling capturing equipment (registers) and the incoming and outgoing junctions. (A 'junction' in British telephonic terms was not a junction in the everyday sense, but the name given to the pair of wires connecting a call between a satellite exchange and the main exchange.) The development of the TXE1 started around 1963. There were models of the AEI equipment at Blackheath and the ATE equipment at Edge Lane, Liverpool. AEI called TXE1 their REX (reed electronic exchanges).

Completion was delayed but the TXE1 went into service in 1968 in Leighton Buzzard. Although designed to handle 10,000 subscribers, it started out with a capacity of 3000, with 152 incoming junctions and 166 outgoing junctions. Later, instead of expansion of the TXE1, capacity was increased with three TXE2 exchanges and a TXE6.

The exchange was housed in a prototype K-type single-story building on the site of the former Lake House in Lake Street. The construction included thermal insulation panels, double-glazing, and under-floor electrical heating. Ventilation arrangements were by eight ventilating units, each handling 600 cu. ft. per min, and a series of "hit-and-miss"-type louvers above the windows on each side of the building provided outlets for heated air.

It was withdrawn from service in 1977 when it was replaced by a TXE4.

=== Description of mechanism ===
Half of the racks making up the TXE1 common control

A unit removed from the TXE1 common control; this was the only part of the exchange where units could be removed, the rest being hard-wired

An equipment practice was needed quickly, and it was realised that a matrix of reed relays would be about the same size as a crossbar switch. Therefore, the equipment practice of AT&E's crossbar system was adopted for the TXE1 apart from the common control, which had its own equipment practice. The common control consisted of 14 racks and made up a complete suite of the exchange. It was made entirely from discrete components as integrated circuits were not yet in common use. There was much discussion by all contractors as to whether there was a reliable connector available to make units interchangeable. STC decided to have the units that could be withdrawn and AT&E and AEI did not. It turned out that the connectors used were reliable and they had a great advantage in fault finding. It also allowed the STC engineers to place a suspect faulty unit in an outrigger so it could be tested in situ.

One of the functions of the common control was to decide which was the best connection to be used through the switching network, and this part was called the route choice. The interrogators would return the available paths and the route choice would make a choice and tell the markers to mark that route.

TXE1 reed relay inserts, which rarely failed

The exchange used reed relays as the switching medium, and the reeds themselves were approximately 3 inches in length and the only ones available. They were provided by the Hivac subsidiary of AT&E (then the only UK manufacturer of reed inserts.) It had multi-stage switching divided into A, B, and C switches, interconnected by links. A typical local call would be connected via A-B-C-Link-C-B-A. Links could each either have or not have transmission bridges for local calls. The bridges were contained within the outgoing junction units.

A TXE1 test console without the rack covers in place. The teleprinter can be seen to its right.

The exchange had some advanced features for the time, including multi-frequency (MF) tone dialling as an option opposed to pulse dialling, and no post-dialling delay for own-exchange calls. It also had the ability to detect a switching failure and automatically attempt a repeat dial. Any repeat attempts were logged to the teleprinter. It also had a test console, which monitored all calls on a digital edge-lit display. Another display gave a visual indication of the traffic flowing through the exchange, named the Hubblemeter after the instigator Ray Hubble. Occasionally the call trace did not work, but the engineers worked out a way of manually tracing a call. What they did was to buy a little compass and glue a piece of magnetic ferrite on the side to pull the compass needle away from north. They would then run this compass along outside of the reed relays, and when a relay was operated the needle would move back to north. This was repeated over several sets of the switching path until the trace was complete.

The TXE1 cabling loft

Inter-rack cabling was via a cable loft. The cables were routed up through packed pass-throughs into a reinforced ceiling.

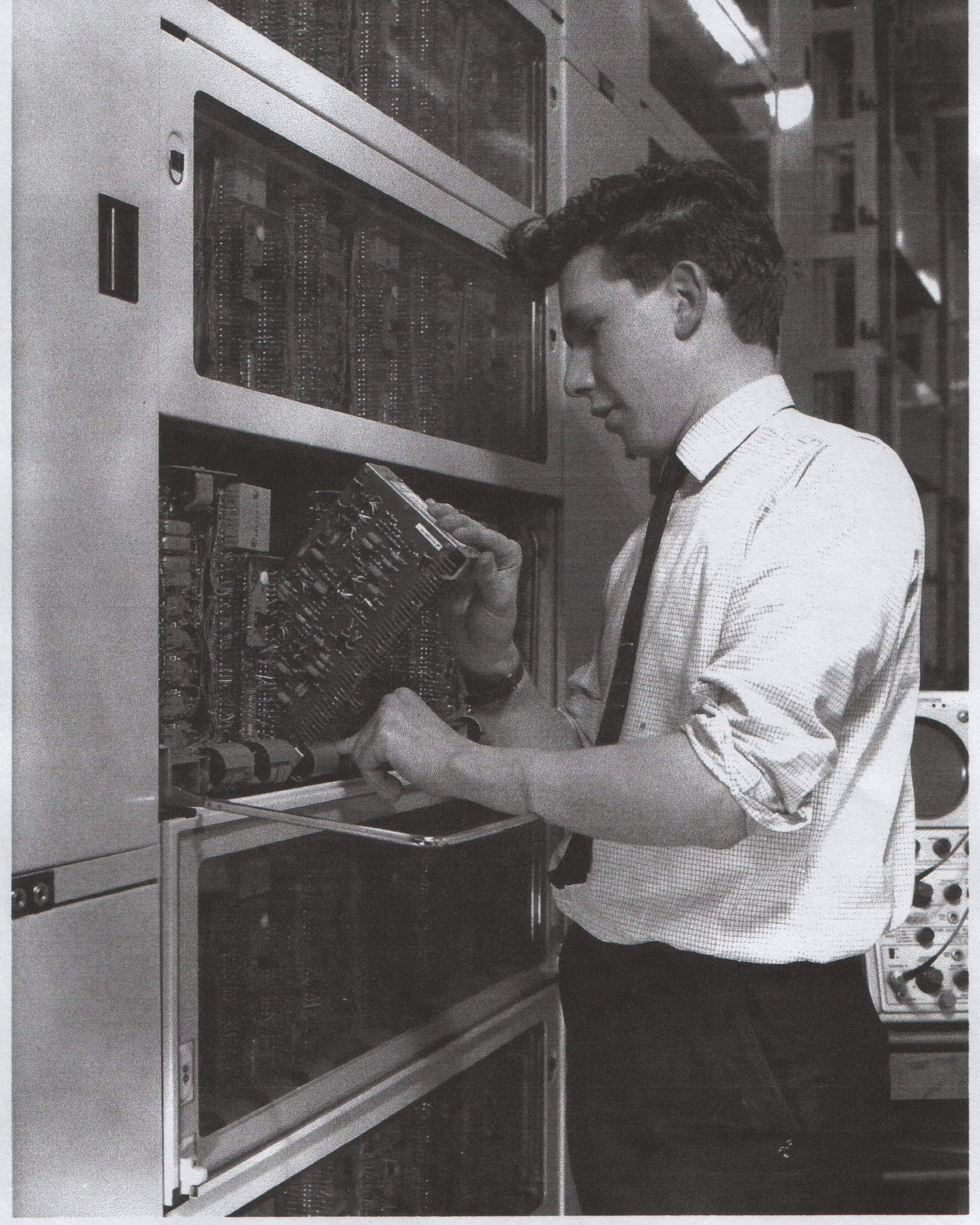
An engineer examining an outgoing junction

A novel but subsequently disastrous feature designed by Bell Antwerp was used to hold the subscriber's class of service information i.e. PBX, shared service, incoming calls barred (ICB), temporary out of service (TOS), etc. This was a capacitor store, and it held information on a thin plastic strip, into which could be inserted up to 10 little copper squares which had a capacitance of 10 pF. The thin plastic strips were then inserted into the Data Store rack, one at the position representing the directory number and another at the position representing the equipment number. This can be seen in the photograph together with some plastic strips hanging by wire. Hanging the strips by wire was a common practice for subscribers who were constantly changing their Class of Service, i.e. being made TOS. This information was then pulsed by the common control translator and appropriate action taken. In the end the problem turned out to be cable interference requiring substantial re-cabling at the rear of the rack. This system was replaced in later TXE exchanges by Dimond rings.

The registers looked after all the dialling, and there were three sorts of registers: loop-disconnect, MF (later called DTMF), and incoming. There were about 20 local registers and 12 incoming registers. The local registers (loop-disconnect and MF) took care of own-exchange and outgoing calls, while the incoming registers dealt with calls coming into the exchange. A local register would provide dial tone to the subscriber, wait for the first dialled digit, and then apply to the translator to see what action was required. The translator could decide by the first digit if it was a local call, and if it was it would instruct the register to come back when it had all the digits. If it was not a local call and therefore to be routed out of the exchange, then it would tell the register to come back with each digit until it could decide on the routing, as not all calls went to the GSC (Group Switching Centre) as there was AAR (alternative available routing). Once the routing had been decided and digits passed on, the register was free to take another call.

The MF senders/receivers were used when an MF subscriber initiated a call. They were set up to the subscribers line and switching network to an MF register, they converted the MF tones to pulses for the registers to store. They used the X, Y, and auxiliary switching planes.

Incoming registers used a time-shared electronic dial path (TDM) to transfer pulsing information from the incoming junction to the incoming register. This feature was necessary to ensure that no pulsing information was lost.

In the event of a cable breakdown or similar event which may result in permanent loops on subscribers lines, after a predetermined time the register would be forcibly released and the subscriber put into a parked condition. This was possible because each subscriber had a dual armature line relay, and in the parked condition only the low-current armature was operated.

The scanners scanned the subscribers seeking out the ones that had initiated a calling condition by lifting their handset, ignoring any in a parked condition. The scanners were mounted in the racks of the associated switching units and fed back information so that a register could be switched to the subscriber to provide dial tone.

There were three outgoing junctions per shelf, and they could be busied by using the keys that can be seen in the photograph.

The TXE1 data store and translator, the twelfth rack of the common controller

The TXE1 required power supplies of −18 V, +50 V and −50 V DC. These were provided by lead–acid batteries charged from the mains supply, backed up by a diesel generator.

=== Reliability and maintenance ===
The exchange proved reasonably reliable, although it did have a few outages. Most of these were caused in the common control area. The common control equipment was divided into functional units, and each unit was duplicated, an A side and a B side, and each section was isolated by means of reed relays. Under either fault conditions or manual control or the predetermined time, the unit indicated would change over to its partner. The changeover of the relays was controlled by a series of reed relays whose reed inserts were wetted with mercury. Periodically over some weeks, the mercury would migrate to the point of contact of the blades, leaving a mercuric bead giving "ON" and both A and B sides into service. The confusion generated caused the exchange to be isolated.

There were also some problems with the ASY63 transistors that had nickel–iron connecting wires and would not take the solder, causing dry joints to the circuit cards. This happened over all sections of the electronic equipment in the common control area. The remedy to this problem was to re-solder connections with a solder with a stronger flux.

For maintenance, the registers were hinged and could be lowered for easier access. These units, unlike the common control, were hard-wired. However, a unit could be changed by breaking straps at the rear and then rewiring them. A subscriber was connected to the local register using the normal reed switching as the local registers were connected to the C switches. However, they were hard-wired to the common control translator.

AT&E and STC created testers so that parts of the exchange could be taken out of service and connected to testers. The testers then simulated the signals that the exchange would send to it, and in this way individual parts of the exchange could be tested.

=== Gallery ===
TXE1 floor plan

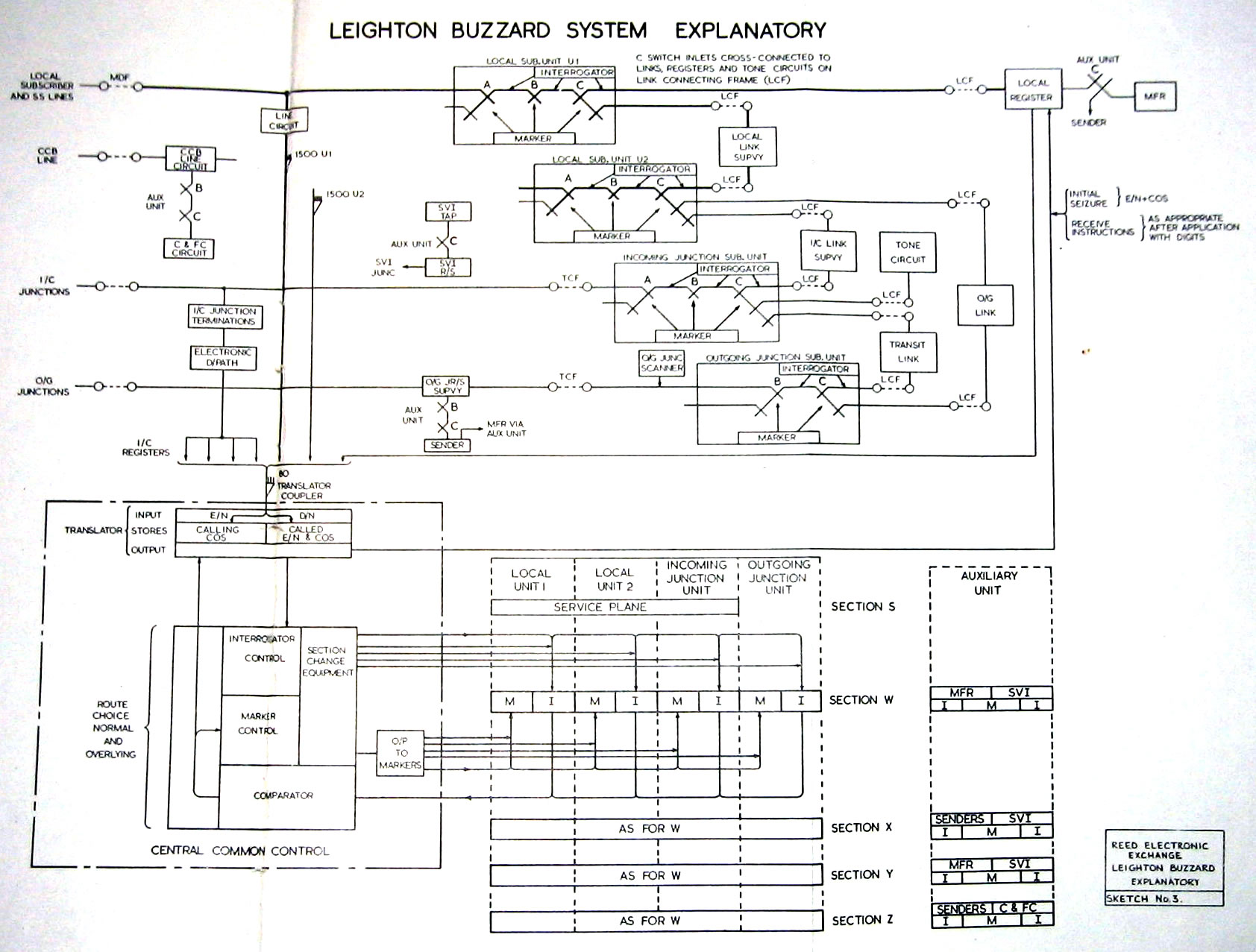
TXE1 schematic

An engineer works on the TXE1 MDF

The day the TXE1 went into service. (L–R) Peter Fiddler, Bev Collins, Ray Hubble

== TXE2 ==
The prototype for the exchange which the GPO called TXE2 was a system called Pentex (the Plessey trademark for all non-GPO sales), which, starting in 1963, was developed by Ericsson Telephones, as part of Plessey. The first field trial of Pentex started in the Peterborough Telephone Area in 1965. There was another trial site at Leamington. The system was designed to serve 200–1,200 customers and about 240 Erlang units. It was therefore mainly used to replace the larger rural Strowger exchanges – usually UAX13s. The first TXE2 was installed at Ambergate, some 20 miles from the Plessey factory at Beeston, and opened on 15 December 1966. Although the system had been developed by Plessey, the GPO had insisted on competitive tendering for the TXE2 exchanges. Production contracts were awarded simultaneously to Plessey, STC, and GEC. Some 2–3,000 TXE2s went into service with the GPO, the last one being withdrawn from service on 23 June 1995.

The Pentex system, which evolved beyond TXE2, was exported to over 30 countries and was largely responsible for Plessey winning the Queen's Award for Exports in 1978.

=== Exchange description ===
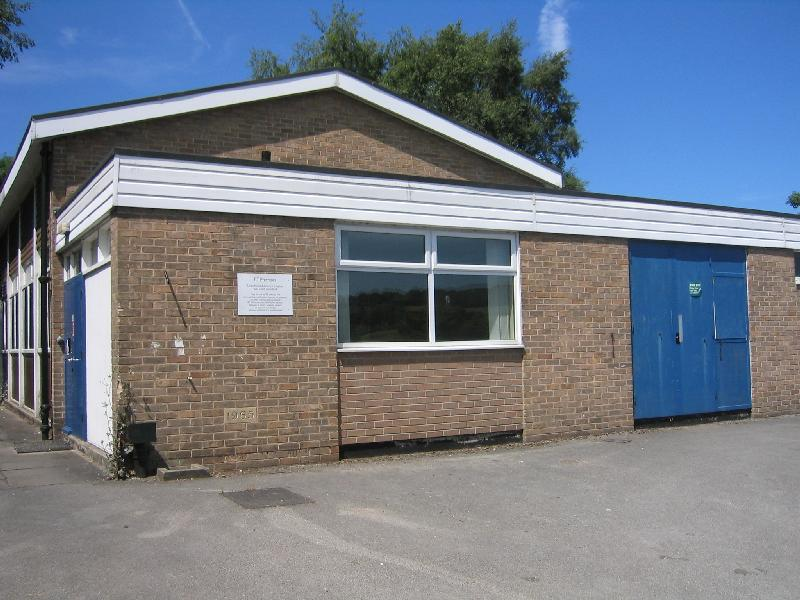
Ambergate the first TXE2 Telephone Exchange

Because of their common control design, isolation (inability of the exchange to set up calls) of the entire exchange was always a possibility and very occasionally happened. This potential weakness had been at least partially recognised in the design of the exchange type, so the most critical common control units were split into three sections and each section was duplicated into an A-side and a B-side. In the event of the equipment detecting a serious fault in one of the side-conscious units, all the units in that section were locked onto the side which was giving good service and a prompt alarm was sent to a staffed centre to indicate that the exchange needed urgent attention.

In normal service, the exchange automatically changed all three sections from one side to the other every eight minutes. If Call Control detected eight failures to set up calls within that eight minutes, then it force-changed all the side-conscious units onto the other side, locked that side in service and raised a prompt alarm. In periods of very low traffic, there would typically be fewer than eight call set-up attempts on the exchange in eight minutes and this would have prevented the above security system from working. The exchange was therefore provided with an automatic Test Call Unit, which originated a test call every 30 seconds. As well as thus enabling Call Control to detect eight failures in less than eight minutes (if all call-attempts were failing), the Test Call would raise its own prompt alarm if it detected 31 sequential call-attempt failures, indicating that neither security side of the exchange was able to connect calls.

Alarm Panel on a preserved TXE2 at Avoncroft Museum. The red lamps show that all three sections are alarmed. The 8-minute changeover will have been suspended and the white lamps show that all three security sections are locked on to side B.

As a further security measure, if the first attempt to set up a path to a register failed, so that, on an outgoing call, the customer did not get dial-tone, the exchange recognised the failure, stored the details of the equipment in use on the failed call and automatically made a second attempt, using different equipment. This happened so quickly (about 50 milliseconds) that, if the second attempt was successful, the customer would not have been aware of the failed first attempt to get dial-tone.

TXE2 Register just before call set up

Unlike the preceding rural Strowger exchanges (UAX 13s and smaller) the TXE2s were equipped with an uninterruptible power supply with auto-starting diesel generators.

MDR printer

MDR graticule

Control Suite in Hullbridge Exchange, a typical early TXE2 installation. It was spacious in comparison to the Strowger UAX13 which it replaced.

As a maintenance aid, the exchange was equipped with a Maintenance Data Recorder (MDR). This had a rather primitive printer, which displayed the identities of equipment in use at the time that the exchange had detected a call failure. For example, in the event of a successful repeat attempt to provide dial-tone, the MDR would print. If the repeat attempt failed, then the MDR would print twice in quick succession, giving details of the equipment in use on both the failed paths. The prints were not easy to read. All that emerged were short burn marks on the special paper in up to 45 different places in each of two rows. It was necessary to hold a plastic graticule (see picture below right, under that of an MDR) over the paper to find out what the presence of each burn mark indicated. If more than eight call failures were detected in less than 8 minutes, then the critical common control units would be forced to change from the side in service (A or B) to the other side, the automatic 8-minute changeover would be suspended and a prompt alarm would be sent out.

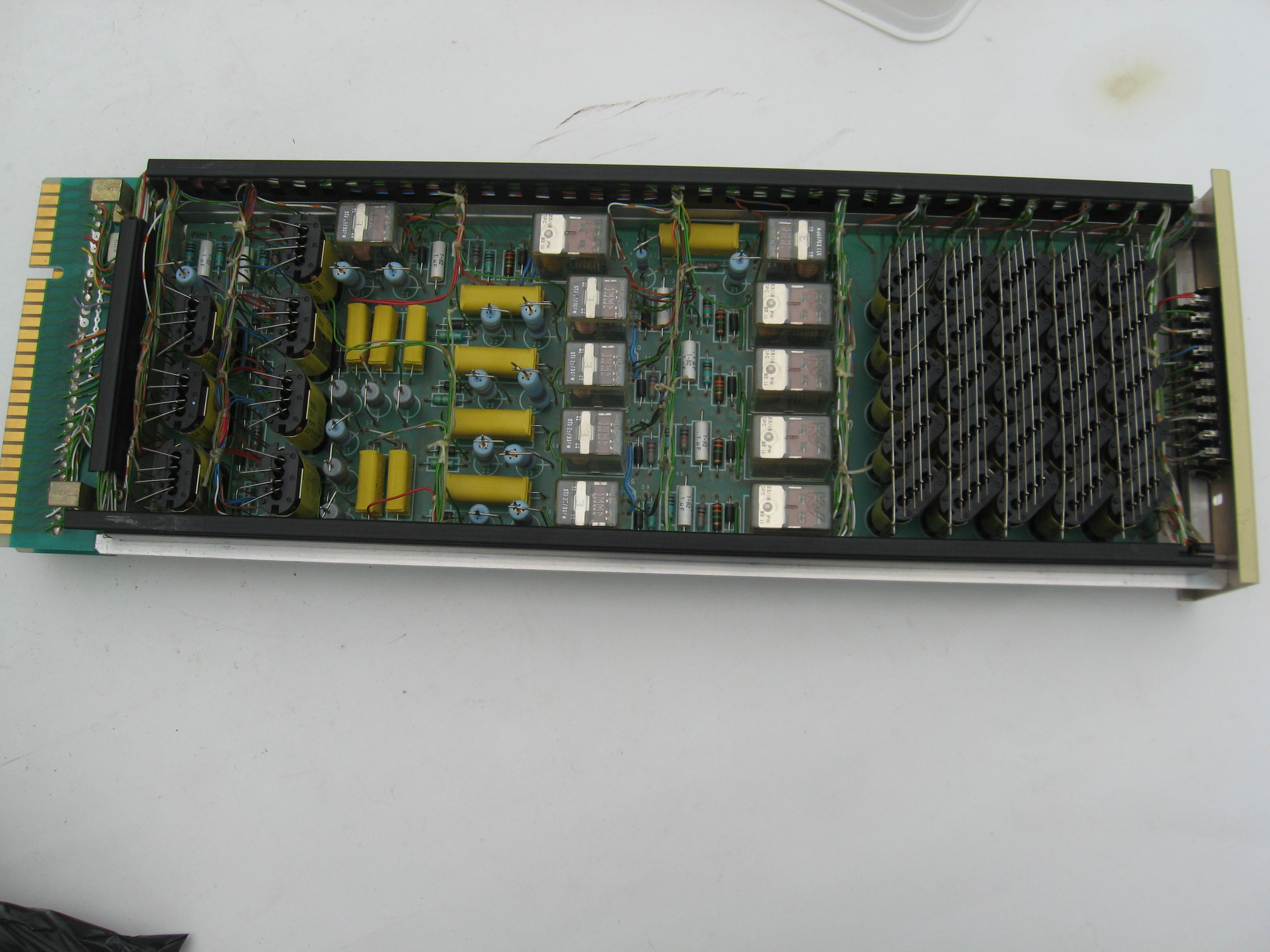
TXE2 Subscribers' Line Unit (SLU) manufactured by STC. Each SLU contained the line relays and A-switches for five customers. It handled the traffic to and from five customers and had five trunks going on to the B switches. There is, therefore, a 5×5 switching matrix of reed relays, which constituted the A-switch. Note that the four reeds in each of these reed relay were in-line, whereas in Plessey reed-relays the reeds were in a square formation. The SLU also contained 10 electro-mechanical relays, two for each line. They were the Line Relay (LR), which was operated when the customer picked up the handset and which generated the calling signal, and a K relay which gave the correct tones and prevented spurious calling conditions. These two relays both provided change-over contacts and therefore had to be electro-mechanical because the reed-relays only gave make-break contacts. The face-plate of the unit is to the right: at the other end, one can see the edge connector. It was feared that this type of connector would cause problems after a relatively low number of removal/re-insertion operations, but in practice, they proved to be more than adequately robust.

In TXE2s, a call which terminated within the same exchange went through seven switching stages, whereas a call going out to another exchange went through just three switching stages. The switches were designated as A, B, C, and D (the paths were A-B-C for outgoing, D-C-B-A for incoming, and A-B-C-D-C-B-A for internal). The common control equipment consisted of B- and C-switch selectors, supervisory selectors (a supervisory relay set stayed in-circuit throughout each call), Register Selectors, Registers, and Call Control.

The most characteristic feature of the exchange's central control unit design was that calls were processed serially. Consequently, call set-up had to be fast. In particular, Call Control had to become free in less than the time of the inter-digital pause on calls incoming to the exchange. This time could be as low as 60 milliseconds. As the TXE2 call-set-up time was some 50 milliseconds, this design requirement was just met, but even so, the overall capacity of the system was determined by the probability of an incoming call being delayed too long in its initial connection to a register.

The grade of service in a TXE2 was dependent on the number of customers in an A-switch group, with access to just 25 A-B trunks. The normal standard on the earlier exchanges was 125 customers per A-switch group. If the A-switch group contained many busy PBX lines, then the number of customers might be reduced to 75. The earlier (Mark I and Mark II – the differences being slight) exchanges could handle up to 2,000 customers. Later on, Mark III TXE2s were able to handle up to 4,000 customers and on these exchanges, where the average calling rate was sufficiently low, up to 250 customers would be in an A-switch group, still with access to just 25 A-B trunks.

TXE2 Ambergate Calling Number Generator (CNG) and Class of Service (COS) rack

The choice of the main type of memory used in the TXE2 (and the TXE4) was particularly characteristic of the general design philosophy, that the components used had to be of a technology that had been tested over many years. The choice thus went to the Dimond ring type of memory, named after T. L. Dimond of Bell Laboratories, who invented in 1945. They were large-diameter magnetic ferrite toroidal rings with solenoid windings, through which are threaded writing and reading wires. These racks gave the ability to convert a subscriber's directory number into an equipment location identity. This was a considerable innovation in British exchanges since in Strowger exchanges the directory and equipment numbers had to be the same.

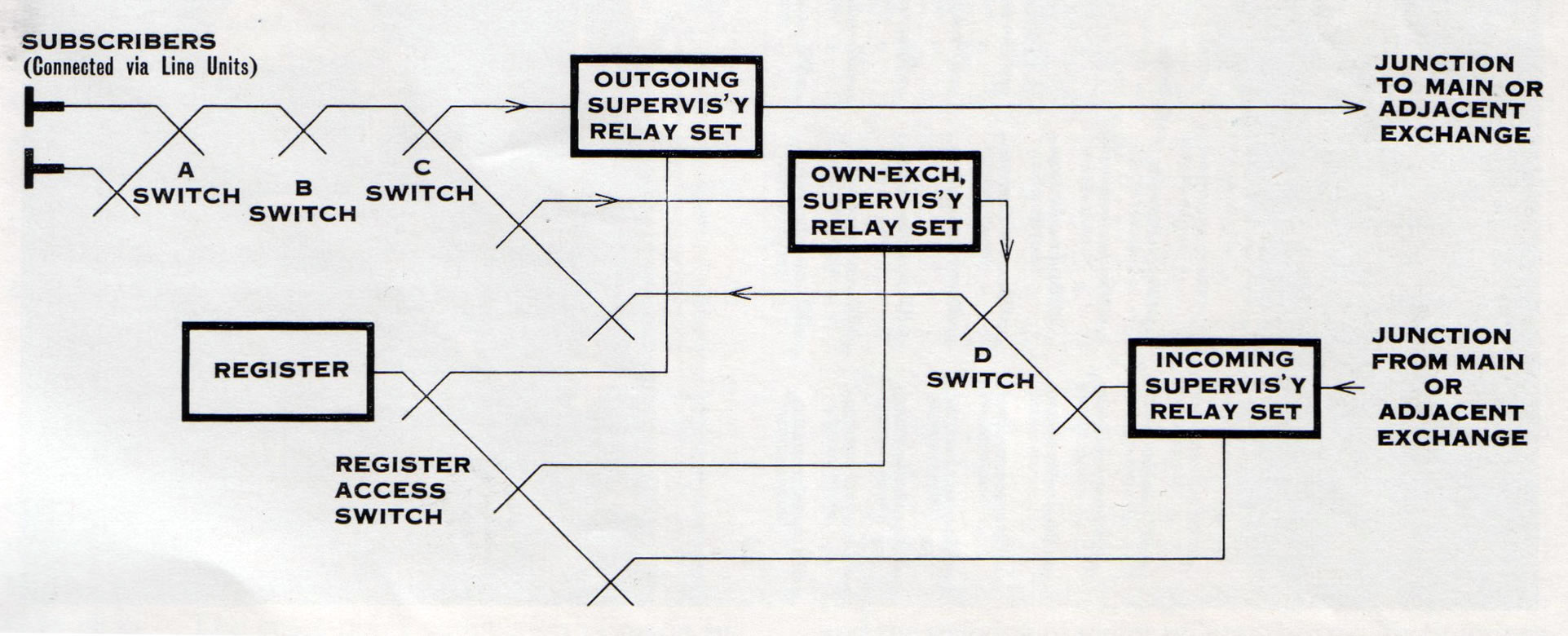
TXE2 trunking

The switching in TXE2s was carried out by reed relays and a typical TXE2 contained about 100,000 reeds. The reeds were fast in operation, with a life expectancy of more than 10 million operations. The glass capsules were about an inch (25 mm) in length and about an eighth of an inch (3 mm) in diameter. Four reeds were generally present inside each relay coil, two for the speech-path, one for holding the path and one for metering. Switching with these reeds held out the prospect of much greater reliability compared with the Strowger system, where switching was carried out by base metal wipers moving through banks of metal contacts. The Strowger switches required routines to be carried out on them to clean the banks: they also required oiling and occasional adjustment. Reed relays required none of this. However, in practice, and particularly in the early years of the system's service, the performance of the reeds proved to be worse than had been expected.

TXE2 Supervisory Relay Set. Designed in the 1960s, it consisted of discrete components mounted on circuit boards. These relay sets were of double width. On the face-plates there were two built-in lamps (for call-tracing and fault indication) and a block of test points, which gave test access to the circuits inside. All TXE2 units had such test points. Three "candles" can be seen protruding from units: these were simple indicator-bulbs which were used as required to show when the relay sets were in use. These "candles" or "busy indicators" were used throughout the exchange as part of fault-finding.

=== Maintenance and reliability ===
The TXE2-specific equipment was different in the TXE2s manufactured by Plessey, STC, and GEC, so that spare equipment had to be held for each type of manufacturer. Importantly, each manufacturer made their own reed inserts (reed were manufactured for GEC by their subsidiary, the Mazda Osram Valve Company) and their performance differed significantly in the first years of production.

All the TXE2-specific equipment was mounted on slide-in units, mainly single-width, but some double-width. There was a structured holding of maintenance spare units. For those which were likely to be needed frequently or urgently in every exchange, such as a Subscribers Line Unit, a spare unit was held in every exchange. For those units for which a spare was likely to be needed less frequently or urgently, the spares were held at an Area centre serving perhaps 6–10 TXE2s of the same manufacture. Finally for those units for which a spare was likely to be needed seldom, the spare units were held at one centre per Region - there being ten Regions in the UK.

In the early (around 1969) Plessey exchanges, a significantly high proportion of the reed-inserts were contaminated with a high-resistance film and were prone to giving an intermittently high-resistance contact. If this occurred in one of the common-control areas of the exchange, it could give rise to the exchange becoming isolated (being unable to set up any calls) for as much as several hours. These faults were very difficult to locate, and in the end, the problems were only resolved by a fairly substantial re-reeding programme carried out on the common-control units of the early Plessey exchanges.

The STC reeds proved to be more reliable, but, if they failed, they tended to stick or short-circuit. This was also a cause of isolations early on, but a simple modification restricted the most serious type of failure to a small part of the exchange. The GEC/MOV reeds proved to be the most reliable of all.

Once the teething troubles had been largely dealt with, which was not until about 1974, the TXE2s realised more of their expected benefits and it was eventually not uncommon for one Technical Officer to maintain the operation of three of these exchanges, serving perhaps some 5,000–6,000 customers in total.

=== Preservation ===
In the summer of 2005 a demonstration rack of TXE2 equipment was transferred to the Connected Earth collection at Milton Keynes Museum.

There is a working MXE2 (mobile variant) at Avoncroft Museum. It can be used to make calls within the museum.

Many of the MXE2s ended up in Northern Ireland. Only one of these ever had to be used 'in anger'. This was at Castlewellan about 1990, when the exchange was blown up by terrorists. The typical set-up time for an MXE2 was about six weeks, but at Castlewellan, full telephone service was restored using an MXE2 (and the additional use of a mobile transmission unit designed by Northern Ireland staff) within one week of the bombing. It did, however, take a lot of subsequent work by the switch maintenance Technical Officers to get the exchange up to an acceptable standard of service, as it had been standing idle for several years.

== TXE3 ==
TXE3 was a cost reduced and improved version of TXE1 designed for exchanges with more than 2,000 subscribers. The same three companies that built the TXE1 developed TXE3, namely STC, AEI, and AT&E, and it was intended to be the standard BPO system for large exchanges. The prototype exchange was built and tested in the Circuit Laboratory at Armour House. The trial period was for 200 subs, 100 were for senior engineers within Telecoms HQ the remaining 100 subs were transferred from Monarch exchange, in the City of London, on a temporary basis (via c/o switches in case something went wrong). The trial lasted from 1969 until 1970.

TXE3 racks see top of the racks for description. The MCU is different from the TXE4 and includes the cyclic store

During the development of the TXE3 it became apparent that the system would be too expensive for the competitive export market, so AEI split its team into two: one to do whatever the BPO wanted and the other to produce a reduced version for export. The trial was started in April 1968 and the model worked very well at Armour House and the BPO ordered the first half dozen exchanges. Jim Warman moved his team back from Blackheath to Woolwich to start a new department with its own manufacturing and marketing. The equipment for the first exchange had been manufactured with a 9,600 capacity and was being installed on site at Royal exchange in London in 1968 when GEC made a takeover bid for AEI. The takeover bid was successful and GEC decided that they preferred the crossbar system to TXE3 and promptly cancelled the contract to supply TXE3 to the BPO. Royal first exchange was dismantled before its installation had been completed and all the TXE3 equipment was broken up and supplied to universities for observation.

=== Exchange description ===
The TXE 3 exchange consists of three main areas:

1. Peripheral equipment comprising subscribers' line circuits, junction terminations, and other units providing a variety of special functions such as coin and fee checking on coin box calls.
2. A switching area through which connections are established between peripheral equipment. It is arranged to give three stages of switching on either side of centrally located link circuits
3. A control area, that received information from peripheral equipment and the switching area, and processed this with data held in its own store to determine the actions required. It issued instructions to the other areas and checks their successful completion, making second attempts if necessary.

The control area was called the Main Control Unit (MCU) and there were two provided on the model for security although a maximum of 12 could have been provided. Each MCU was capable of handling approximately 6,000 instructions per hour. The MCU operated in accordance with an instruction program stored in the form of a number of wires threading a bank of magnetic cores. Changes in the operating sequence can be obtained by program changes involving the re-threading of a number of wires in the store instead of by widespread re-wiring within and between a multitude of separate units.

Line scanning circuits sequentially examined the state of each line, junctions, and so on by means of a pulse many times a second and immediately after each pulse a data store (the Cyclic Store) offered the MCU permanent information relating to the line. When a calling condition was detected, the scanning pulse was passed to the MCU indicating to it that a new call had to be set up and busying it temporarily to further calls. As the first steps in dealing with the new call the MCU recorded the directory number and class of service (shared service, PABX line, incoming junction register, TOS, and so on) information offered by the Cyclic Store and allocates one of its associated group of up to 30 registers. The registers were connected to peripheral terminals of the switching network, in the same way as subscribers' lines, junction circuits and other units and the MCU proceeded to issue instructions to the network to connect the subscriber and register terminals.

The switching network was composed of reed relay cross-points arranged to give three (A, B, and C) stages of switching on either side of a number of linking circuits. The A-stage switches concentrate traffic from the peripheral terminals on to B-C-stage arrays, which are internally connected to provide full accessibility between every B-switch terminal and every C-switch terminal of the array. A simple switch enabling two subscribers to be connected to two others can be constructed, but extending this to larger sizes becomes increasingly uneconomic. Nevertheless, by splitting the network into two stages, considerable economy could be affected.

To connect the allotted registers to the calling line, the MCU asked the interrogator-markers to identify all free paths from the subscriber to the central, "through" type, links, and from the register to the links. This information was returned to the Route Choice Unit, which then identified those link circuits, which were available to both peripheral terminals, and selected the most suitable, according to predetermined rules chosen to make maximum use of the network. Its decision was signalled back to the MCU which then instructed the interrogator-markers to mark the chosen pair of paths, starting from the link out through the C, B, and A stages to the subscriber, and then from the other side of the same link, through C, B, and A-stages to the register.

The register then checked the connection to the subscriber and sent dial tone. Normally, the whole process took about one-fifth of a second, less than the time required for the subscriber to lift the handset to his ear. The MCU, having completed its immediate tasks for this call, was free to deal with other demands. It retained a record of the calling equipment number against the identity of the register and notes the stage, which had been reached in the progress of the call.

The subscriber dialled the required number and as each digit was received it was stored in electronic circuits within the register, which will call for the MCU after each digit and ask for instructions. Until sufficient digits have been received to determine the outgoing route from the exchange, the instruction will be "apply again after the next digit" and the MCU returned to serving other demands.

When sufficient digits had been received, the MCU would have been able to determine the required path through the exchange, the routing digits to be sent (if an outgoing call is indicated), and which of the received digits have to be repeated forward. It would advise the register accordingly and then set the paths necessary to allow the register to signal forward and finally extend the caller to the required number or junction.

On calls which terminated on the exchange a transmission bridge and supervisory circuit needed to be introduced within the switching network. This was done by employing a "bridge link" in the final connection. To allow metering on own-exchange calls these links also contain local call timing elements which pulse the P-wire in the desired "X" or "Y" phase at the appropriate times. "X" and "Y" phases were only required to support the metering for shared service subscribers, which has long since disappeared thankfully.

Similar procedures would be followed for any other type of call. In every case the MCU would decide, in accordance with its program instructions, what connection pattern was appropriate in the circumstances indicated and issue orders for setting the paths.

Within each MCU information was handled in a "two-out-of-five" code which enabled errors to be detected, and the output of the program store was duplicated to give additional protection.

The TXE 3 model gave satisfactory service and the experience gained from the model confirmed the validity of the basic design and led to the development of the TXE4.

=== Gallery ===
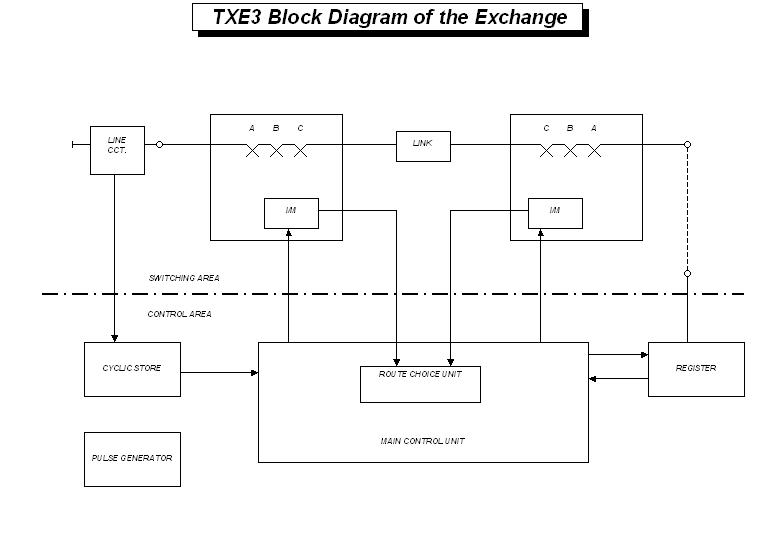
TXE3 Block Diagram, NB no D switch on terminating path, although TXE2 and TXE4 did have D switches

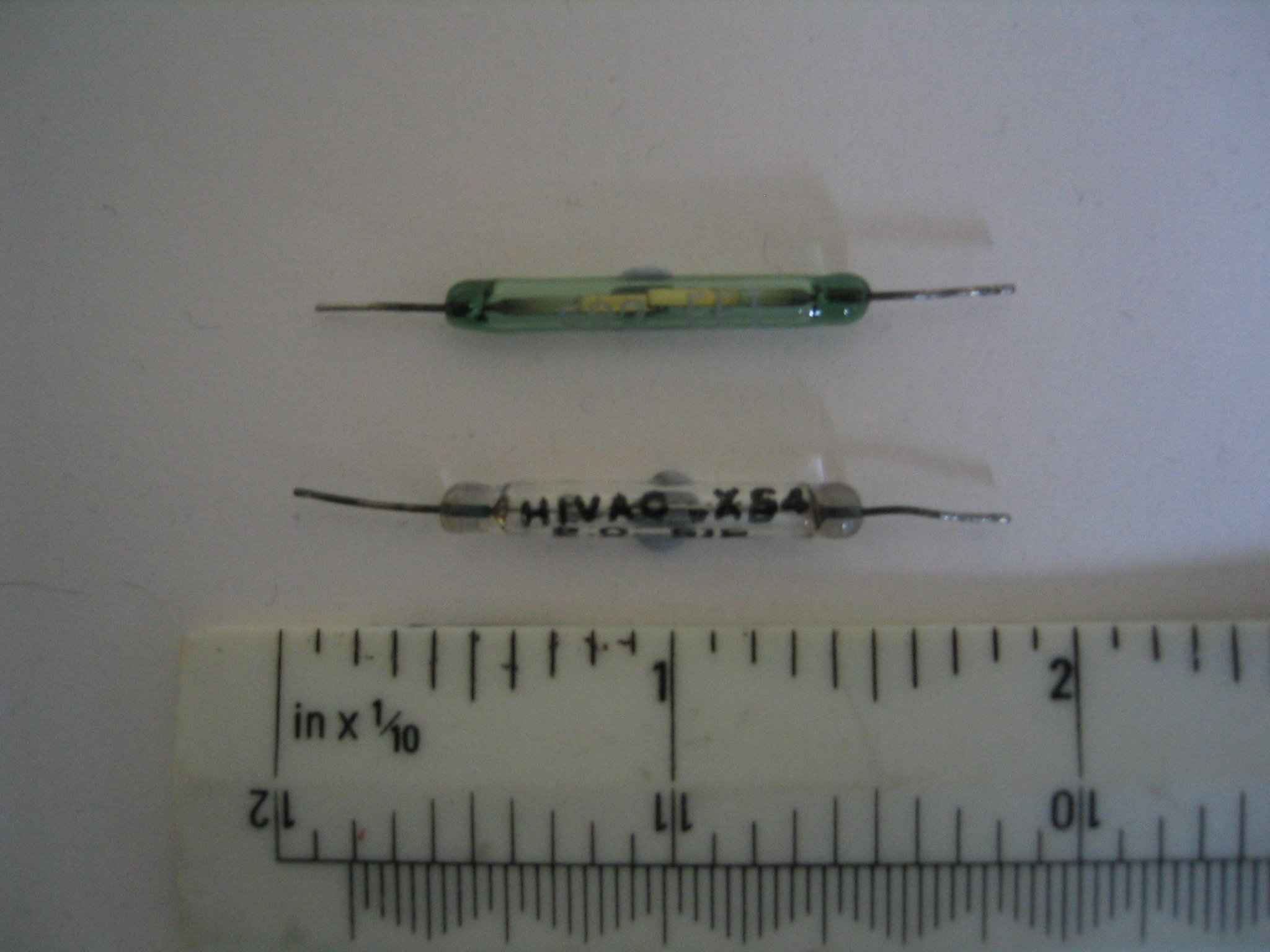
TXE3 Reeds

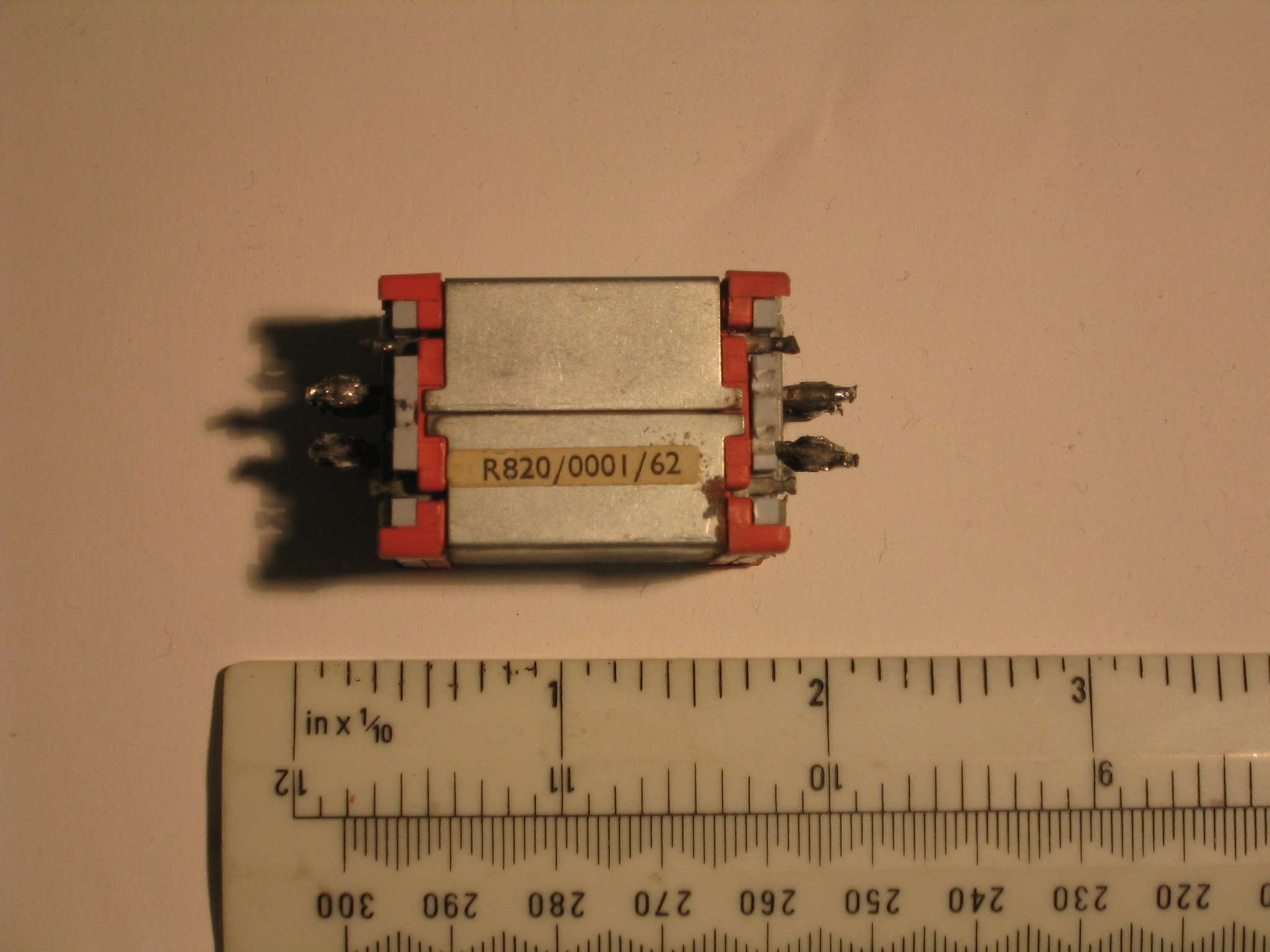
TXE3 Reed Relay

== TXE4 ==
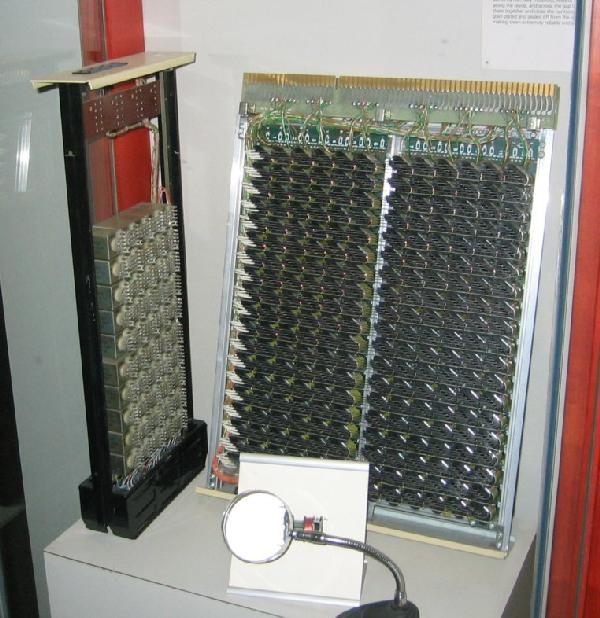
TXE2 (left) and TXE4 (right) switching matrix SIU in the London Science Museum

The TXE4 was a cost reduced development of the TXE3 system and catered for up to 40,000 subscribers with over 5,000 erlangs of both-way traffic and was normally staffed by several Technical Officers (TO). This was developed purely by STC to a specification from the GPO. It was built at the STC Southgate factory in north London and used reed relays as the switching medium which proved reliable in service. Later a few exchanges were also manufactured by Plessey and GEC. It had a programmable common control called the Main Control Unit (MCU) and each exchange had at least three MCUs for security and a maximum of twenty, but in theory, could operate with just one. It had a unit called the Supervisory Processing Unit (SPU), which took control of the calls from information supplied to it by the MCU.

These racks contained the subscriber COS in the first four levels and their telephone number the last 5 levels. The clipped-on white cores provided TOS (Temporary Out of Service) status.

This is the panel of the MCU which was the processor of the exchange

Two engineers Dave Atkins (left) and Tim Walker (right) examine a MTWS

To prove the enhancements of TXE4 over the TXE3 a test bed trial installation was installed in Tudor exchange in Muswell Hill, North London in 1969. After a successful two-year trial a contract was placed with STC for the provision of £15million of TXE4 equipment in June 1971.

The first production TXE4 was installed in 1973 at Rectory, a Birmingham area exchange at Sutton Coldfield, and brought into service on 28 February 1976. TXE4 is sometimes known as TXE4RD where the RD stood for Rectory Design. Rectory opened with 4,300 subscribers and had a maximum capacity of 8,000. In 1983 there were 350 TXE4s in service serving four million customers. The last TXE4s were taken out of service (at Selby, Yorkshire and Leigh-on-Sea, Essex) on 11 March 1998.

=== Exchange description ===
The switching was via reed relays and multi-stage like the TXE1. The difference from the TXE1 design was that an extra switching stage to simplify growth problems. Thus, a typical path would be A-B-C-Link-D-C-B-A.

Subscriber information was programmed into the exchange in racks called cyclic stores which used PTFE wire threaded through magnetic cores known as 'Dimond ring' (see TXE2 section for more information). The information stored was the class of service (COS) i.e. PBX, coin collecting box (CCB), or single line, followed by the directory number. The subscribers derived an equipment number from the position on the cyclic store rack. This was a six-digit number and referred to as the MUCKBL. In some parts of the exchange, equipment was in the format of BUMCLK. When a subscriber lifted their handset it sent a pulse down this wire, which was picked up by a 156 ms scanner, which set up a path through the reed relays to a register. This register then returned dialling tone to the subscriber and dialling could commence.

Up to 36 registers were "owned" by each MCU. The MCU was responsible for looking after all of its Registers and deciding from the dialled information where the call was going to be routed. The local exchange numbering system would be available to the MCU via threadings in the cyclic store so the MCU would be able to read this information and in this way, all exchanges could be configured as required. If a call was identified by the MCU as internal to the exchange, usually by the first digit, then the MCU would tell the Register to come back when the complete number had been dialled. If the first dialled digit was a zero then this would normally be routed straight to the Group Switching Centre. However, if the exchange had an Alternative Available Route then the MCU would have to wait until enough routing digits had been received to make a routing decision. This AAR information was stored in the cyclic stores. Once the MCU had decided the routing, it sent a command to the Interrogator/Markers to set up the required path and also told the Register what dialled digits to forward on. Then the MCU would move on to the next task. Once the connection had been established, the Supervisory Processing Unit (SPU) took care of the path and all the call metering tasks. The MCUs had core memory to hold the dialled digits from all the Registers and also had other storage to manipulate call set-up information. There were three scan rates: 156ms for subscribers; 36ms for Registers, Outgoing Junctions, and Routing Translations; and 12ms for Incoming Junctions. The last of these was the quickest scan, to ensure that no incoming digits were lost from the incoming junctions.

Timing pulses were generating by the Pulse Generator Rack. The generator used a delay line oscillator of 166.7 kHz to produce a basic pulse of six microseconds duration and this was fed to eight ring counters which then multiplied up the basic six microsecond pulses into the various pulse requirements. There were four generators with a redundancy of one.

A problem was discovered very late in the development of the TXE4 in that if an equipment number was threaded with the wrong directory number on the cyclic stores, it could clash with the directory number of another equipment number leading to multiple directory numbers. This would cause Number Unobtainable (NU) tone when the incorrectly threaded number was dialled and the double threading number received incorrect calls. The exchange had no way of detecting this but the programming of one of the MCUs allowed a separate program to run to detect errors and print out the locations of the duplicates. This had to be done on a regular basis. Eventually, after many more diagnostic routines had been added, this became known as Tester 299A.

The MCU executed a program stored in 10 Slide in Units (SIU) located at the bottom of the MCU rack. These MTWS units (Miniature Threaded Wire Store), were matrices of eight by ten cores through which enamelled wire were threaded. Each MTWS held 500 program steps. The first 8 MTWS were used for normal operations and the last two were reserved for special routines.

The 5,000 programming steps were addressed with a letters from A-E and three decimal digits e.g. B253. The letter was decided in various ways, one example was by a decision (e.g. whether some information was present, e.g. A=true, B=false resulting in either A253 or B253). Each named step consisted of eight decimal digits, depending on which cores the wire was threaded through. The first three digits (e.g. 891) told the MCU what program step to go to next. The next two digits defined the operation (e.g. 55, compare two pieces of information) and the last three told the MCU where to store the result (e.g. 020, put this information in Main Ferrite Store 10). So the whole program step would be 89155020 which would lead to the next step being A891 if the answer was true or B891 if the answer was false. Each step took 12 microseconds to execute. The program could be easily changed, on site, as developments and upgrades occurred throughout the life of the TXE4 design.

The MCU contained a non-volatile data store, which used a core store. There were three types of data store, Main Ferrite Store (MFS), Special Ferrite Store (SFS), and Register Ferrite Store (RFS). The MFS was used by the MCU itself to hold data for various reasons and the SFS was used for manipulating data. An example of this was that SFS2 could take the data stored in positions 1-5 and swap them with data stored in positions 6–10. Each store held 10 decimal digits, represented in two-out-of-five code. The RFS held data from each of the MCUs associated registers, e.g. dialled digits. There were 20 MFS, 4 SFS, and up to 36 RFS.

The MCU was informed by the Supervisory Processing Unit if the setting up switching paths had failed. In this case the MCU would instigate a repeat attempt to set a new path. The details of the failed path were printed.

The TXE4 had two standard teleprinters, which logged fault indications and other information. The difficulty of manually spotting trends brought an attempt to take the paper tape that the teleprinter produced, as well as the print, and automatically analyse it. PATE4 (Print Analysis TXE4) was an experimental program used that read the paper tape looking for common fault patterns.

The TXE4 exchanges were designed for a mean time between failures of 50 years.

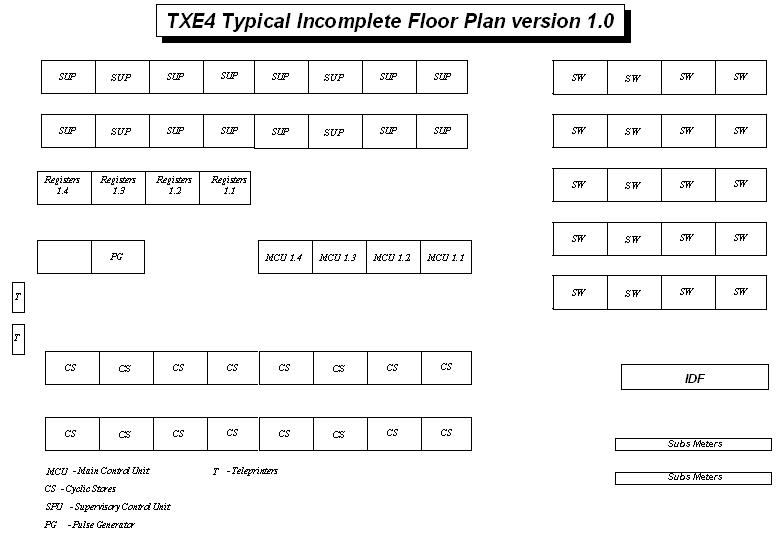
TXE4 Floor Plan

=== Incomplete List of TXE4 exchanges ===
Exchange name	Region	Opening date	Closing date	Exchange name	Region	Opening date	Closing date
Ashton on Ribble	NE	Unknown	Unknown	Henley	Northern HC	Unknown	Unknown
Atherton	NE	Unknown	Unknown	Horsham Carfax	SE	16/09/1983	1998
Basingstoke	Unknown	Unknown	Unknown	Kettering	East Mids	19/11/1980	Unknown
Belstead	Eastern	11/05/1982	Unknown	Langley South	Northern HC	Unknown	Unknown
Blackburn	NW	Unknown	Unknown	Leagrave	Eastern	02/09/1981	Unknown
Blackpool	NW	Unknown	Unknown	Leeds Headrow	NE	Unknown	Unknown
Bolton	NW	Unknown	Unknown	Leighton Buzzard	Eastern	Unknown	Unknown
Bowes Park (London)	London	Unknown	Unknown	Letchworth	Eastern	Unknown	Unknown
Bracknell	Northern HC	Unknown	Unknown	Liverpool	NW	Unknown	Unknown
Bradwell Abbey (Milton Keynes)	Eastern	28/08/1979	Unknown	Maghull	NW	Unknown	Unknown
Cambridge Central	Eastern	31/07/1979	Unknown	Melton Mowbray	East Midlands	Unknown	Unknown
Canvey Island	Eastern	Unknown	Unknown	Middlesbrough	NE	Unknown	Unknown
Catford	London	Unknown	Unknown	Muswell Hill	London	Unknown	Unknown
Caversham Reading	Northern HC	Unknown	Unknown	Newmarket	Eastern	18/08/1982	Unknown
Cherry Hinton (Cambridge)	Eastern	04/08/1981	Unknown	Norwich	Eastern	16/02/1985	Unknown
Chesham	Eastern	28/05/1981	Unknown	Nottingham Archer	East Mids	Unknown	1992 ?
Clacton	Eastern	25/05/1982	Unknown	Nottingham Crusader	East Mids	Unknown	1990
Cosham	SE	Unknown	Unknown	Oxford City	Northern HC	Unknown	Unknown
Crowthorne	Northern HC	Unknown	Unknown	Ponders End	Unknown	Unknown	Unknown
Dorchester	SE	Unknown	Unknown	Port Talbot	WM	Unknown	Unknown
Fareham	SE	Unknown	Unknown	Reading South	Northern HC	Unknown	Unknown
Farnborough (Hants)	Northern HC	1982	Unknown	Rectory	Central Mids	28/02/1976	13/09/1994
Felixstowe	Eastern	05/03/1983	Unknown	Scarborough	NE	Unknown	Unknown
Gerrards Cross	Northern HC	Unknown	Unknown	Selby	NE	Unknown	11/03/1998
Gorleston	Eastern	26/01/1983	Unknown	Shepherds Bush	London	Unknown	Unknown
Great Yarmouth	Eastern	Unknown	Unknown	Southend	Eastern	Unknown	Unknown
Guildford	Northern HC	Unknown	Unknown	Stamford Hill	London	Unknown	Unknown
Harwich	Eastern	29/06/1984	Unknown	Stevenage	Eastern	12/07/1983	Unknown
Havant	SE	Unknown	Unknown	Watford	London	Unknown	Unknown
Haverhill	Eastern	25/08/1981	Unknown	Wolverhampton	Central Mids	Unknown	Unknown
Headington	Eastern	19/11/1980	Unknown	Woolston	SE	Unknown	Unknown

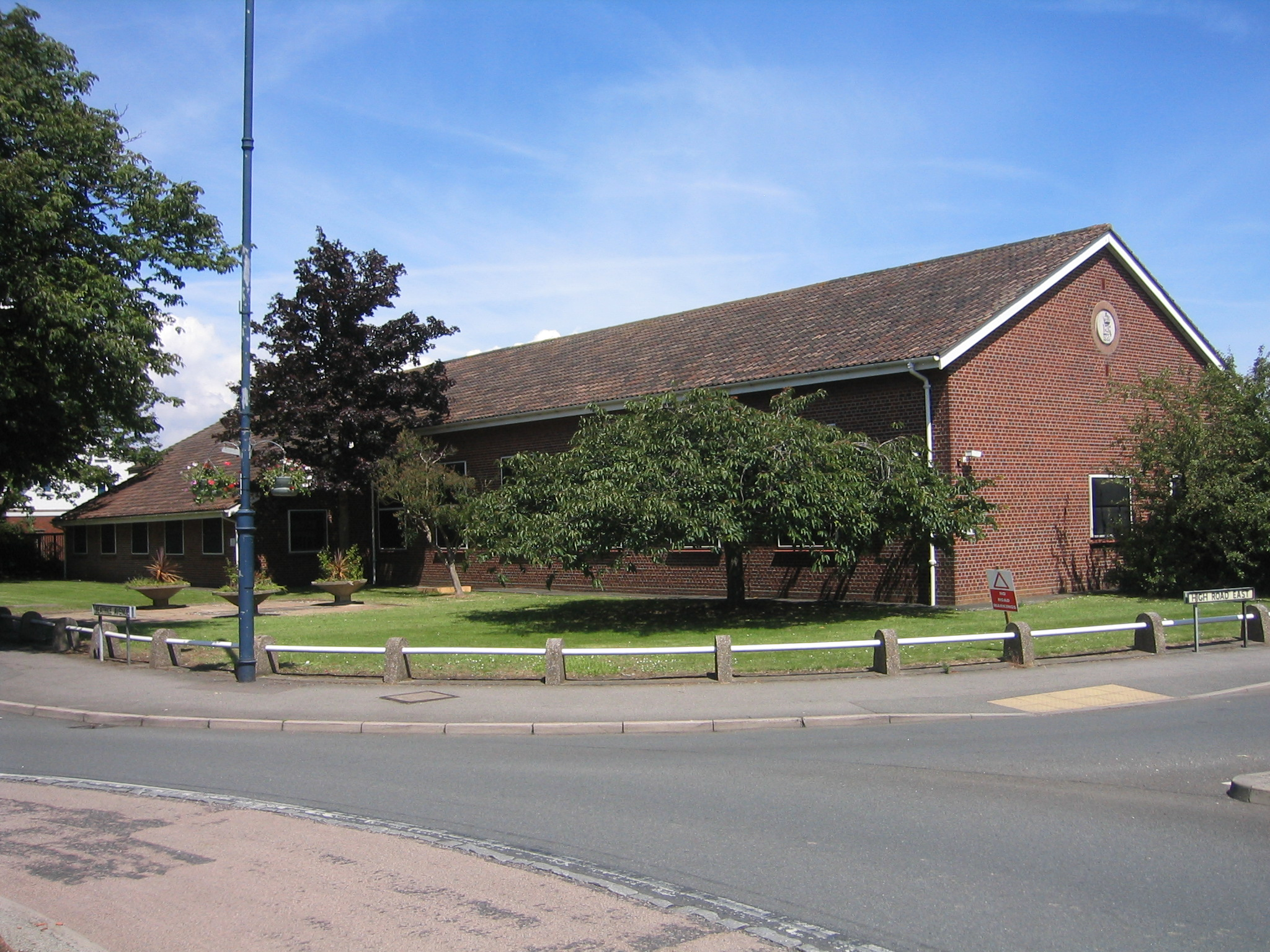
The building that held the Felixstowe TXE4

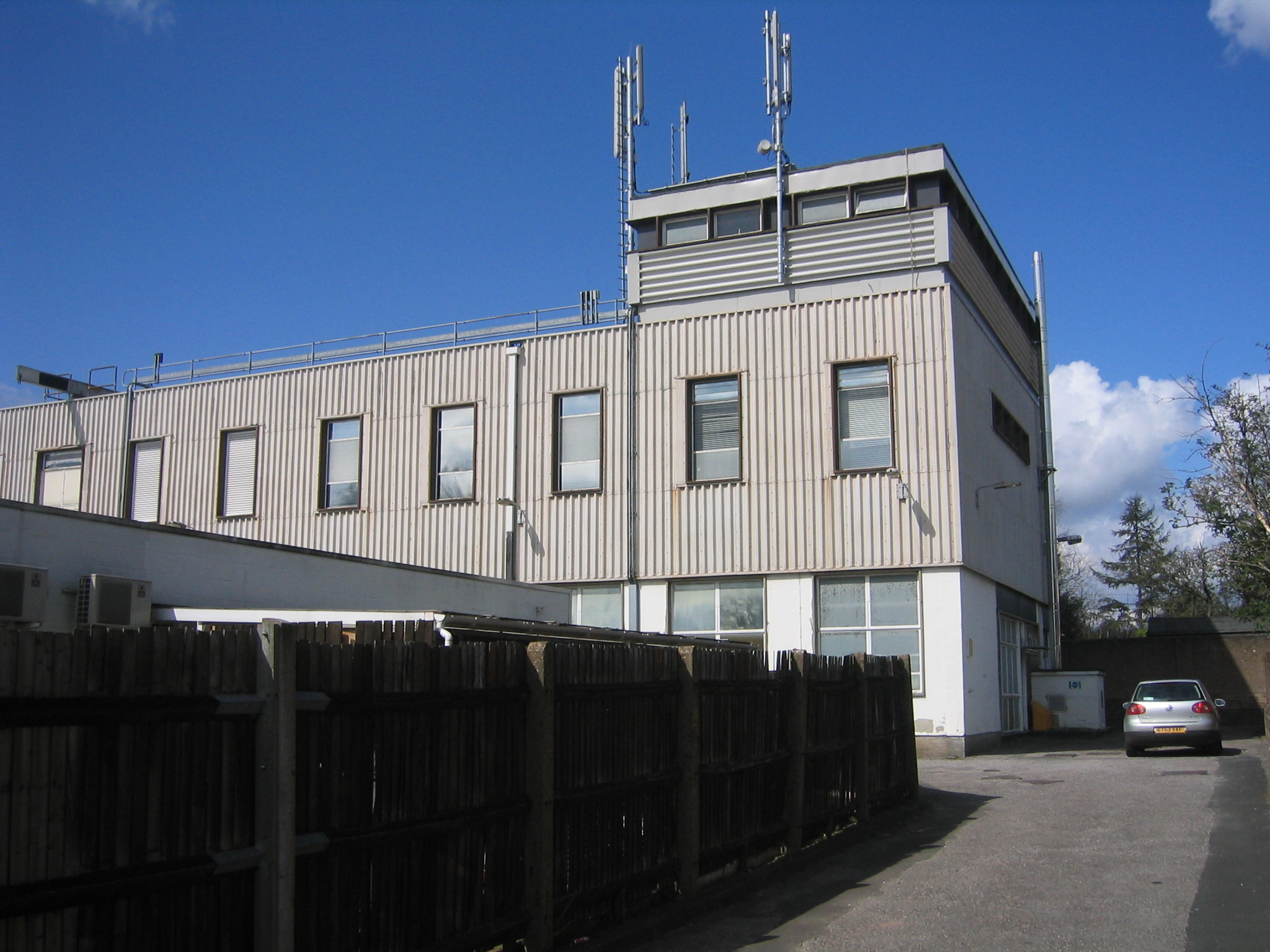
The building that held the Headington TXE4 near Oxford

== TXE4A ==
TXE4A was the last in the line of TXE exchanges and an improved version of the TXE4. It was developed by STC after Post Office Telecommunications commissioned them, in 1975, to produce a 15% reduction in cost and provide more customer facilities. It had the same switching as TXE4 but a redesigned common control, using integrated circuits (including microprocessors) to achieve significant size and cost reductions.

TXE4A dispensed with Dimond rings and used solid-state memory. This allowed for changes to exchange data i.e. customer information to be made by keyboard instead of by manually threading jumpers through Dimond rings.

The TXE4 MCU program was stored in EPROM with capacity for 32k 16-bit instructions. Each instruction took 2 microseconds to execute except those accessing Registers which took 6 microseconds. The higher performance enabled the maximum number of registers per MCU to be increased.

The first TXE4A to enter service was Belgrave on 28 February 1981. Over 550 TXE4 and TXE4A exchanges were installed and were in use for over 20 years serving 8 million lines. The TXE4/A system proved to be highly successful and reliable until eventually replaced by System X. The TXE4 era came to an end on 11 March 1998 when Selby and Leigh-on-Sea were replaced by digital exchanges.

=== Incomplete List of TXE4A exchanges ===
Exchange Name	Region	Opening Date	Closing Date	Exchange Name	Region	Opening Date	Closing Date
Ascot	Northern HC	Unknown	Unknown	Hayling Island	SE	Unknown	Unknown
Belgrave	Midland	20/02/1981	Unknown	Hampden Park	SE	Unknown	Unknown
Bicester	Eastern	10/1982	Unknown	Highams Park	London	Unknown	Unknown
Bognor Regis	SE	Unknown	Unknown	Horley	SE	Unknown	Unknown
Chelmsford	Eastern	Unknown	Unknown	Isle of Man	NW	Unknown	Unknown
Chingford	London	Unknown	Unknown	Leigh-on-Sea	Eastern	Unknown	11/03/1998
Clevedon	Wales&West	06/1981	Unknown	Queensmere Slough	Northern HC	Unknown	Unknown
Colchester	Eastern	Unknown	Unknown	Shoreham-By-Sea	SE	Unknown	Unknown
Colchester (High Woods)	Eastern	Unknown	Unknown	Stanford le Hope	Eastern	28/11/1982	Unknown
Dunstable	Eastern	Unknown	Unknown	Stevenage	Eastern	Unknown	Unknown
Eastbourne Neville	SE	Unknown	Unknown	Summertown	Eastern	Unknown	Unknown
Eastwood (Southend)	Eastern	Unknown	Unknown	Tilehurst Reading	Northern HC	Unknown	Unknown
Fleet (Hants)	Northern HC	Unknown	Unknown	Waterlooville	SE	Unknown	Unknown
Grays Thurrock	Eastern	Unknown	Unknown	Windsor	Northern HC	Unknown	Unknown

== TXE4E ==
TXE4E (Enhancement) was developed by STC and introduced in the late 1980s to update both TXE4 and TXE4A exchanges to provide similar features to those available on System X exchanges, including 'Star Services', CCITT 7 common-channel signalling and itemised call-logging. Analogue signalling on transmission circuits was replaced with the SS7 signalling system that was used on System X and AXE10. This provided the call gapping control that stopped exchanges being overloaded by too many incoming calls (an example being when newspaper competitions misprinted winning numbers).

=== Exchange description ===
The enhancement features were implemented on additional dedicated processing modules interconnected by an Ethernet backbone with the MCU and SPU processors. The enhancement software was implemented on Intel 8080, 286, and 386 processors running on RMX.

TXE4A MCUs and SPUs had been designed from the outset with provision for the addition of a communication port to interface to a back-end system, whereas TXE4 MCUs and SPUs had not.

The TXE4E replaced the ten Miniature Threaded Wire Stores (MTWS) of the TXE4 with two units, each containing six chips which were removable and re-programmed with a separate computer. This doubled the program store with an additional bank-switched 5,000 program steps and provided the communication port to interface to the enhancement processors. The Cyclic Stores threading fields (12mS x 156mS and 3 x 36mS) were commoned and all new subscribers, ceases, or change of Class Of Service, which were previously threaded, were now done via a terminal.

The system also had the capability to busy equipment and reset alarms remotely.

The cyclic store gates, where all the subscriber information was held, were replaced by solid-state devices as phase two of the enhancement.

Due to the improved electronics TXE4A and TXE4E (or TXE4RD/IW interworking) were able to receive downloadable updates for tariff data at bank holidays etc. This downloadable capability enabled the centralised control of a lot of the manual functions that previously had to be carried out manually at each exchange. Tariff changes for the eight million customers could be built and implemented by one person following the introduction of a centralised data management tool. At the time this gave a similar capability as available on the System X and AXE10 exchanges.

== TXE5 ==
TXE5 is believed to have been reserved for an improved version of the TXE2. Such a version was never produced.

== TXE6 ==
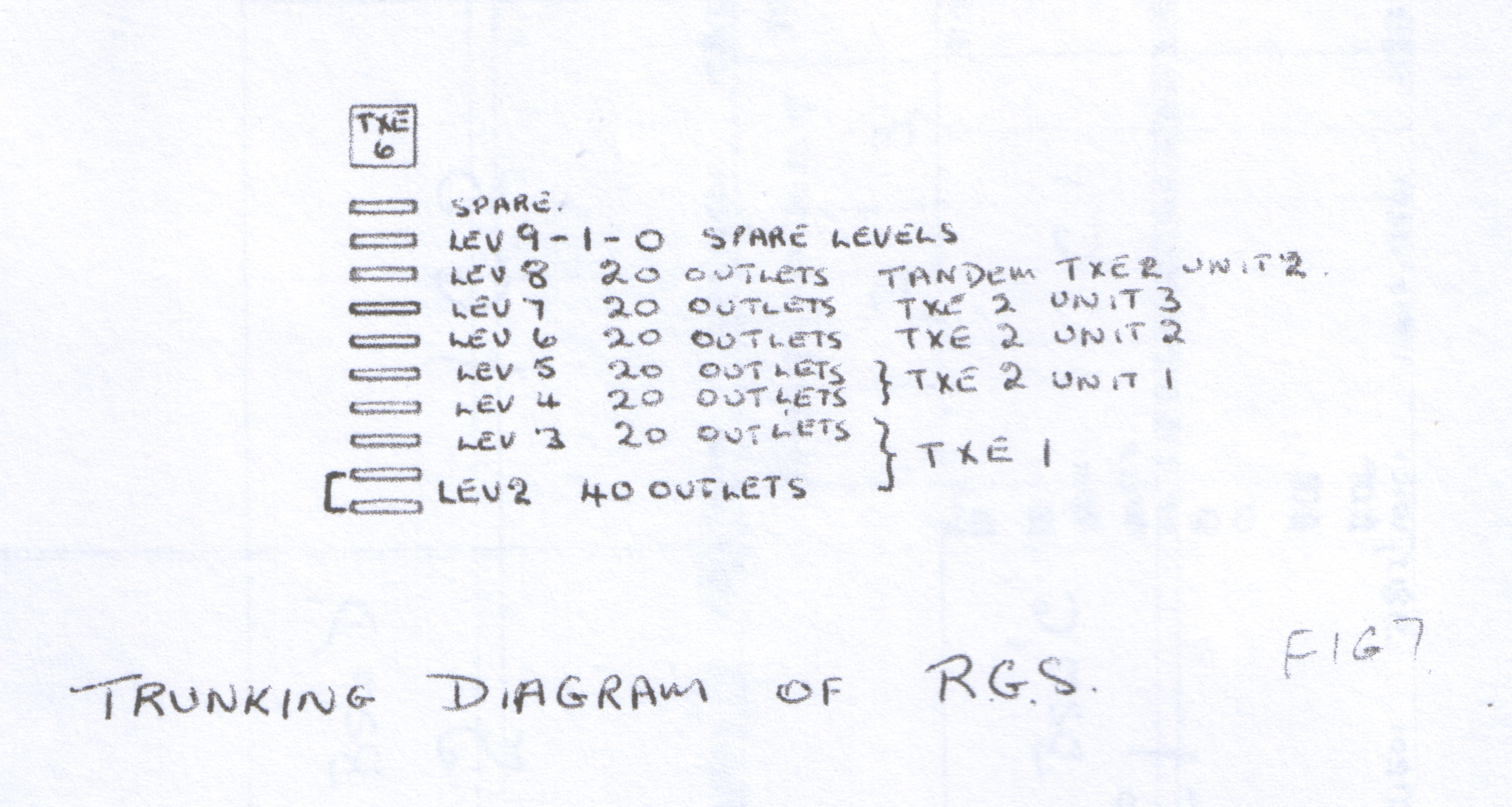
The Outgoing trunking from part of the handwritten documentation of the TXE6 at Leighton Buzzard. It shows the unique environment of having a TXE1, three TXE2s, and a TXE6 in service in the same building all at the same time.

TXE6 was an electronic common control exchange that was designed to extend Strowger exchanges, and known as the Electronic Reed Selector System or Reed Group Selector (RGS). Only two were built: one in London and the other at Leighton Buzzard. The one in London was moved and combined with the one at Leighton Buzzard.

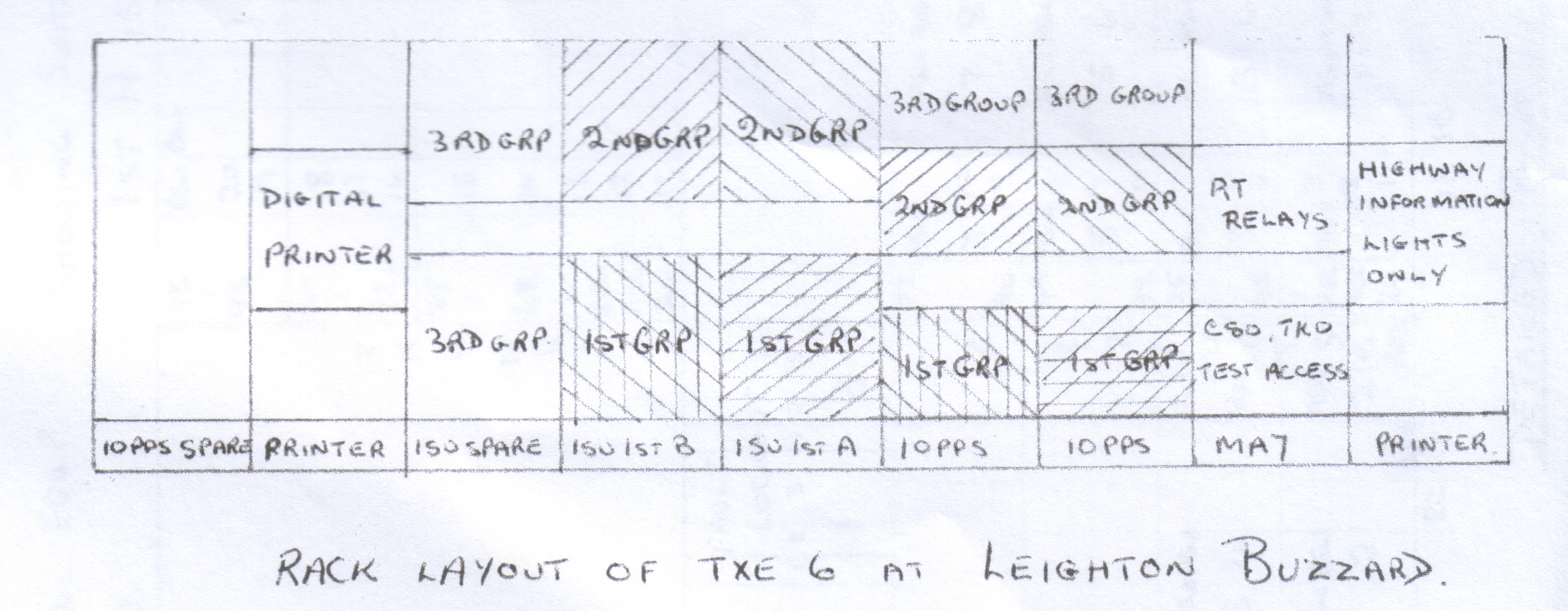
The Rack Layout from the handwritten documentation of the TXE6 at Leighton Buzzard.

It was never used for its intended purpose but merely acted as the front end to incoming junction calls at Leighton Buzzard and directing them to either the TXE1 or one of the three TXE2 exchanges, which was decided by the first dialled digit. The TXE6 went into service on the night of 18 August 1971 and proved very reliable until withdrawn from service in 1977, when a TXE 4 exchange took over from the TXE 1 and three TXE2 exchanges.

=== Exchange description ===
The TXE6 consisted of two parts: a unit for receiving digits at 10 pulses per second (p.p.s.), followed by a two-stage cross-point-switch. The 10 p.p.s. unit was the interface, converting information from dialled pulses, in Strowger form, to fast parallel signal conditions for the reed group-selector registers. The 10 p.p.s. unit was equipped with four controls, and on each there were 96 access circuits, making a total input of 384 junctions. The intermediate switching unit also had four controls, each of which was divided into two parts. Each part controlled a switching unit of 48 inlets and 200 outlets arranged over 10 levels. This gave a total of 1,600 outlets over the ten levels or 160 trunks per level. The outlets were graded over the four controls. A feature of the TXE6 unit was that two equipment levels could be combined to give an availability of 40 trunks from any one level. This facility was used at Leighton Buzzard.

== Timeline of TXE exchanges ==
Date	Action
1956	JERC formed
1959	Prototype TDM Model Exchange Dollis Hill
1962	Highgate Wood Telephone Exchange
1963	JERC agrees to return TDM to research and concentrate development on Reed Systems
1963	TXE1 development started
1963	Plessey started development of TXE2
1964	TXE3 design initiated
1965	TXE2 Field Trial started at Peterborough
1966	First TXE2 in service at Ambergate
1968	First and only TXE1 opens at Leighton Buzzard
1968	TXE3 trial started, then abandoned by GEC for commercial reasons.
1969	JERC ended
1971	Contract placed with STC for TXE4
1971	TXE6 enters service
1976	First TXE4 opens at Rectory, a suburb of Birmingham
1977	TXE6 withdrawn from service
1977	TXE1 withdrawn from service
1981	First TXE4A opens
1995	Last TXE2 removed from service
1998	Last TXE4 removed from service
1998	Last TXE4A removed from service
