= Stored-program computer =

Type of computer

A stored-program computer is a computer that reads the program instructions it is executing directly from fast electronic storage. This approach removes the time consuming setup costs associated with plugboard based computers, and removes the speed bottleneck imposed by the use of mechanical readers such as punched cards or punched tape.

The definition is often extended with the requirement that the treatment of programs and data in memory be interchangeable or uniform.

== Description ==
While both instructions and data are stored in the same memory system, the access paths to them may be different. The von Neumann architecture uses the same access path for both instructions and data, while the Harvard architecture has separate access paths for instructions and data. However, the term stored-program computer is sometimes used as a synonym for the von Neumann architecture. Hennessy and Patterson wrote that the early Harvard machines were regarded as "reactionary by the advocates of stored-program computers".

== History ==
The concept of the stored-program computer can be traced back to the 1936 theoretical concept of a universal Turing machine. Von Neumann was aware of this paper, and he impressed it on his collaborators.

Many early computers, such as the Atanasoff–Berry computer, were not reprogrammable. They executed a single hardwired program. As there were no program instructions, no program storage was necessary. Other computers, though programmable, stored their programs on punched tape, which was physically fed into the system as needed, as was the case for the Zuse Z3 and the Harvard Mark I, or were only programmable by physical manipulation of switches and plugs, as was the case for the Colossus computer.

In 1936, Konrad Zuse anticipated in two patent applications that machine instructions could be stored in the same storage used for data.

In 1948 ENIAC, originally programmed by electrically connecting subsystems with cables, was modified to run programs stored in digital format in its function tables. It ran its first program stored this way on April 12, 1948.

In 1948, the Manchester Baby, built at University of Manchester, is generally recognized as world's first electronic computer that ran a stored program—an event on 21 June 1948. However the Baby was not regarded as a full-fledged computer, but more a proof of concept predecessor to the Manchester Mark 1 computer, which was first put to research work in April 1949. On 6 May 1949 the EDSAC at Cambridge University ran its first program, making it another electronic digital stored-program computer. It is sometimes claimed that the IBM SSEC, operational in January 1948, was the first stored-program computer; this claim is controversial, not least because of the hierarchical memory system of the SSEC, and because some aspects of its operations, like access to relays or tape drives, were determined by plugging. The first stored-program computer to be built in continental Europe was the MESM, completed in the Soviet Union in 1950.

=== The first stored-program computers ===
Several computers could be considered the first stored-program computer, depending on the criteria.

- IBM SSEC, was designed in late 1944 and became operational in January 1948 but was electromechanical
- In April 1948, modifications were completed to ENIAC to function as a stored-program computer, with the program stored by setting dials in its function tables, which could store 3,600 decimal digits for instructions. It ran its first stored program on 12 April 1948 and its first production program on 17 April. This is not considered a stored-program computer by some computer historians.
- ARC2, a relay machine developed by Andrew Booth and Kathleen Booth at Birkbeck, University of London, officially came online on 12 May 1948. It featured the first rotating drum storage device.
- Manchester Baby, a minimal fully electronic computer, built to prove the practicality of the Williams–Kilburn tube CRT random-access memory. It successfully ran a stored program on 21 June 1948.
- Manchester Mark 1, the practically useful full-scale computer developed from the Manchester Baby. It ran its first program in early April 1949 and was immediately made available for use by other university departments and Ferranti; Ferranti developed the design into the first commercially available computer, the Ferranti Mark 1.
- Electronic Delay Storage Automatic Calculator, EDSAC, which ran its first programs on 6 May 1949, and became a full-scale operational computer that served a user community beyond its developers.
- EDVAC, conceived in June 1945 in First Draft of a Report on the EDVAC, but not delivered until August 1949. It began actual operation (on a limited basis) in 1951.
- BINAC, delivered to a customer on 22 August 1949. It worked at the factory but there is disagreement about whether or not it worked satisfactorily after being delivered. If it had been finished at the projected time, it would have been the first stored-program computer in the world. It was the first stored-program computer in the U.S.
- In 1951, the Ferranti Mark 1, a cleaned-up version of the Manchester Mark 1, became the first commercially available electronic digital computer.
- The Bull Gamma 3 (1952) and IBM 650 (1953) were the first mass-produced commercial computers, respectively selling about 1200 and 2000 units.
- Manchester University Transistor Computer, is generally regarded as the first transistor-based stored-program computer having become operational in November 1953.

=== Telecommunication ===
The concept of using a stored-program computer for switching of telecommunication circuits is called stored program control (SPC). It was instrumental to the development of the first electronic switching systems by American Telephone and Telegraph (AT&T) in the Bell System, a development that started in earnest by c. 1954 with initial concept designs by Erna Schneider Hoover at Bell Labs. The first of such systems was installed on a trial basis in Morris, Illinois in 1960. The storage medium for the program instructions was the flying-spot store, a photographic plate read by an optical scanner that had a speed of about one microsecond access time. For temporary data, the system used a barrier-grid electrostatic storage tube.

== See also ==
- Stored program control
