= Switching Control Center System =

The Switching Control Center System was an operations support system developed by Bell Laboratories and deployed during the early 1970s. This computer system was first based on the PDP-11 product line from Digital Equipment Corporation and used the CB Unix operating system and custom application software and device drivers that were developed and maintained by Bell Labs in Columbus, Ohio USA. SCCS was ported to the AT&T 3B20 and 3B5 computers running UNIX System V Release 2 in the early 1980s.

Prior to the SCCS, many telephone company switching centers were staffed 24 hours a day 365 days a year. With SCCS, telephone companies could significantly reduce the number of technicians and dispatch them as required to resolve problems or perform routine maintenance operations.

During the early 1970s, telephone companies began to phase out the older electromechanical switching systems such as the Number 1 Crossbar, Number 5 Crossbar, and step-by-step circuit switching systems and replace them with newer electronic switching systems that were controlled by proprietary computers but still used analog switch fabrics such as Bell-proprietary ferreed switch devices.

The SCCS system was phased out during the late 1990s and replaced by an OSS known as Network Monitoring and Analysis or NMA that was developed by Bell Communications Research now Telcordia Technologies. AT&T developed additional products based on SCCS software, such as Compulert.

The primary purpose of the SCCS system was to provide operations, administration, maintenance, and provisioning (OAMP) functions for telephone company network operations staff. The SCCS accepted as input the slow 110 baud Teletype messages from circuit switching systems such as the Number 1 ESS, Number 2 ESS, Number 3 ESS, Number 5 ESS, and Traffic Service Position System (TSPS) network switches and provide analysis, reports, troubleshooting support, and other functions using newer faster DataSpeed-40 terminals.

This system was documented in the Bell System Technical Journal and AT&T internal Bell System Practices during the 1970s.
