= Number Five Crossbar Switching System =

The Number Five Crossbar Switching System (5XB switch) is a telephone switch for telephone exchanges designed by Bell Labs and manufactured by Western Electric starting in 1947. It was used in the Bell System principally as a Class 5 telephone switch in the public switched telephone network (PSTN) until the early 1990s, when it was replaced with electronic switching systems. Variants were used as combined Class 4 and Class 5 systems in rural areas, and as a TWX switch.

5XB was originally intended to bring the benefits of crossbar switching to towns and small cities with only a few thousand telephone lines. The typical starting size was 3000 to 5000 lines, but the system had essentially unlimited growth capacity. The earlier 1XB urban crossbar was impractically expensive in small installations, and had difficulties handling large trunk groups. 5XB was converted to wire spring relays in the 1950s and otherwise upgraded in the 1960s to serve exchanges with tens of thousands of lines. The final 5A Crossbar variant, produced starting in 1972, was available only in sizes of 990 and 1960 lines, and generally delivered on one pallet, rather than assembled on site as usual for larger exchanges.

== Switching Fabric ==
A diagram showing the line link, trunk link, and junctor layout for an ideal 5XB switch.

5XB introduced the call-back principle, in which the initial concentrating switch train from the line to the digit receiver was entirely dropped during call completion so its links could immediately be reused for this or another call. This is in contrast to earlier crossbar systems where the original switch train was simply built up and expanded as the call was connected, and not dropped in favor of a completely new one. It also uses entirely the same four-stage switching fabric for incoming as for outgoing calls, instead of separate fabric, as had been done in earlier systems. These developments had the overall effect of simplifying the switch fabric, and using it as a "service" rather than as an immutable part of the call, as was the case in most earlier systems.

All lines are terminated on line link frames (LLF) and all trunks and most service circuits on trunk link frames (TLF). Each TLF is connected to all LLF by at least ten junctors. Calls from subscribers originate at line link frames and pass through trunk link frames on their way to their destinations.

=== Line Link Frame ===
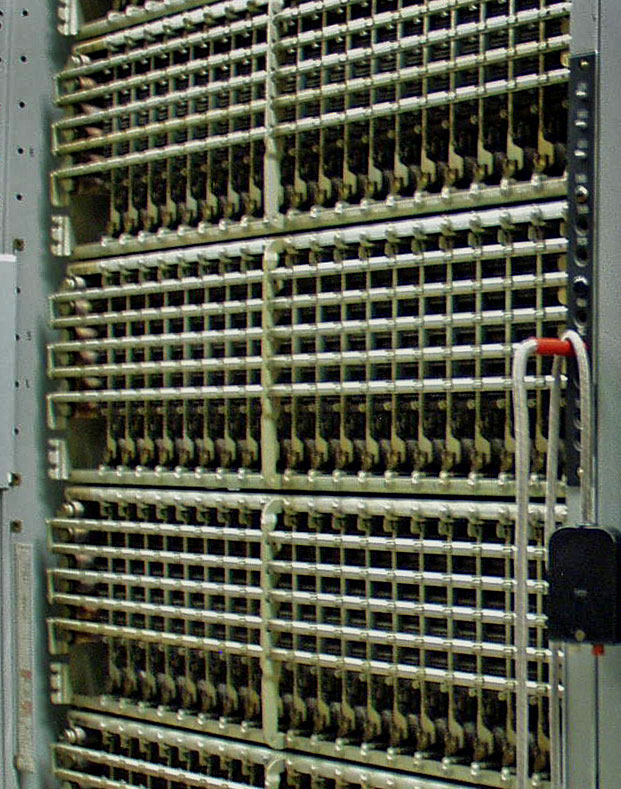
Part of a bay of 10x20 3-wire crossbar switches in a LLF

Line link frames (LLFs) are tiers of 10x20 crossbar switches in two or more bays. The switches in the first bay have their horizontal multiples, or "banjo wires", cut in half, effectively dividing each switch into a line switch and a junctor switch. Each of the ten junctor switches have ten junctors on its ten verticals, and each of its ten levels was wired as a line link, to one of the ten line switches of the LLF. Thus, the line link frame terminates 100 Junctors. Each junctor has full availability to however many hundreds of lines there are, via the hundred line links. The number of lines, thus the line concentration ratio (LCR), was engineered for the expected occupancy.

Each line switch in this first, mixed bay has nine lines on nine of its verticals, the tenth vertical being reserved for test purposes. In addition to the 90 lines on these switches, each LLF has at least one simple line switch bay, with ten more line switches carrying 200 lines. Thus the minimum size of a LLF is 290 lines for a line concentration ratio of 2.9:1. Optionally it has still another frame, with ten more switches and another 200 lines, and so forth, up to a maximum line concentration ratio of 5.9:1 since they all shared the same hundred line links. The line circuit is much like that in 1XB with a line relay for alerting the exchange to a trip condition, and the vertical off-normal contacts of the switch vertical serving as cutoff relay.

For control purposes the subscriber lines on the switches of the LLF are divided into vertical groups of fifty, being five line units on each of ten switches. Each vertical group is divided into five vertical files of ten lines, important because class of service, or customer group identification in later Centrex offices, is shared by all ten lines in the vertical file. Staff in Centrex offices spent much time standing on ladders, rewiring the Class of Service data fields at the top of LLF.

Late in the career of 5XB, junctor group size and thus link efficiency of the largest offices was increased by the use of auxiliary line link (ALL) frames. The ALL is a bay with ten junctor switches, divided as usual into left and right halves. One half has on its levels the line links of an even numbered LLF, and on its verticals, the junctors of the neighboring odd numbered one; the other half is vice versa. By this means, each LLF can use the junctors of its mate, if the marker failed to find an idle path on the first try. Since they are odd and even, their junctors appear on opposite sides of the trunk junctor switches, thus giving access to the mate trunk links as well. Connections through the ALL were only used in heavy traffic periods.

=== Trunk Link Frame ===
Junctors are wired from LLF through the junctor grouping frame to the levels of trunk junctor switches in the trunk link frame (TLF). Unlike earlier designs, the junctors have no supervisory relays or other active hardware, all such functions being assigned to trunk circuits. The basic design of the TLF has ten junctor switches with their horizontal multiples split in half, hence two hundred junctors, and two hundred trunk links to the ten trunk switches. The banjo wiring of the trunk switch was not split, but a discriminator level trick devoted two levels to doubling the use of the other eight, thus allowing each trunk switch to connect sixteen trunks to its twenty trunk links. This results in the TLF having a 0.8:1 trunk concentration ratio (TCR). This degree of deconcentration eventually turned out to provide too few trunk appearances for the variety of trunk types needed. The final 1970s 5XB offices had type C trunk switches with twelve levels, using two for discrimination, leaving a TCR of unity.

The TLF having twice as many links, junctor switches, and junctors as the LLF, there are always twice as many LLFs as TLFs. As first designed, the maximum number was ten TLFs and twenty LLFs, known as 10x20, and at first rarely achieved. In the late 1950s multiple trunk junctor switch bays (ETL and SETL) were added to give each TLF access to more junctors. The first expanded version allowed each office to have 20x40, and in the 1960s the maximum reached 30x60. Development stopped at that point because the four-stage layout was becoming progressively less efficient at greater sizes, and because the 1ESS switch with eight stages was under development.

A channel from a line to a trunk consisted of three links of switching fabric: line link, junctor, and trunk link. In a 10x20 or larger office, ten channels, numbered 0 to 9, were available from any line to any trunk. The line junctor switch number and the trunk junctor switch number are the same as the channel number. Logic in the marker compares the ten links of each kind to obtain a clear channel. The lack of a channel is called a mismatch and resulted in picking another trunk, or another line, or the use of the ALL where that exists, or giving up and letting the caller try again.

== Trunk circuits ==
As in previous designs, supervision of incoming calls is handled by relay sets known as incoming trunk circuits, which sit at the entry point just outside the switching network. Unlike in previous designs, outgoing trunk circuits are used for the equivalent outgoing functions. This means that the junctors, which have the same name as earlier crossbar systems, are simplified, and are now only wires providing links between lines and trunks. The outgoing trunk circuits, which are placed at the outside edge of the switching network, are responsible for originating-side supervision. Since different outgoing trunks are connected to different places and are used for different calls, their relay sets can be specialized for a particular kind of signalling or call metering (see automatic message accounting) or other peculiarity. Thus a TSPS trunk can give complete control to an operator, while an E and M signaling trunk can do the kind of signaling required of a private long-distance line, while a local outgoing trunk can be simpler.

Thanks to this more complex trunk circuit, outgoing trunks are selected by a quicker and more versatile method than the sleeve test previously used. Each trunk circuit provides a ground on an FT lead to indicate idleness. The FT leads for trunks in a particular group are cross-connected to a FTC (frame test common) lead for the trunk link frame upon which it appears, to indicate that the TLF has one or more idle trunks in that group. The route relay in the completing marker connects sensor relays to all the trunk link frames, allowing the marker to choose a TLF that has an idle trunk and then connect to that trunk through the trunk link connector (TLC) to choose one of those idle trunks. This two step method, along with the mixing of incoming and outgoing traffic, distributed traffic more evenly, thus alleviating the link congestion problems that often arose with earlier methods that restricted a trunk group to one or two outgoing switch frames.

This method is less efficient for coin phones, which need special signalling. In urban areas, they were served by older exchanges that had separate junctors for coin phones. Where the 5XB was the only exchange, a number of work-around methods were devised. Regular and coin phones shared the more complex and expensive coin trunks, or else separate routes were established, or coin trunks connected via tandem switches including the 5XB itself acting as its own tandem. In this last case, the call had to use two connections through the switching fabric: one to connect the line to the coin supervision trunk and another to connect that trunk to the outgoing trunk.

It was also less efficient for tandem calls, since the fabric is unable to connect a trunk directly to a trunk. Instead, each incoming trunk that has the ability to make tandem calls has to have a line link frame appearance, as if it were a line. To avoid expense, incoming trunks were divided into groups, some of them having tandem ability and some not. This complication was avoided in places big enough to pay for a separate tandem switch.

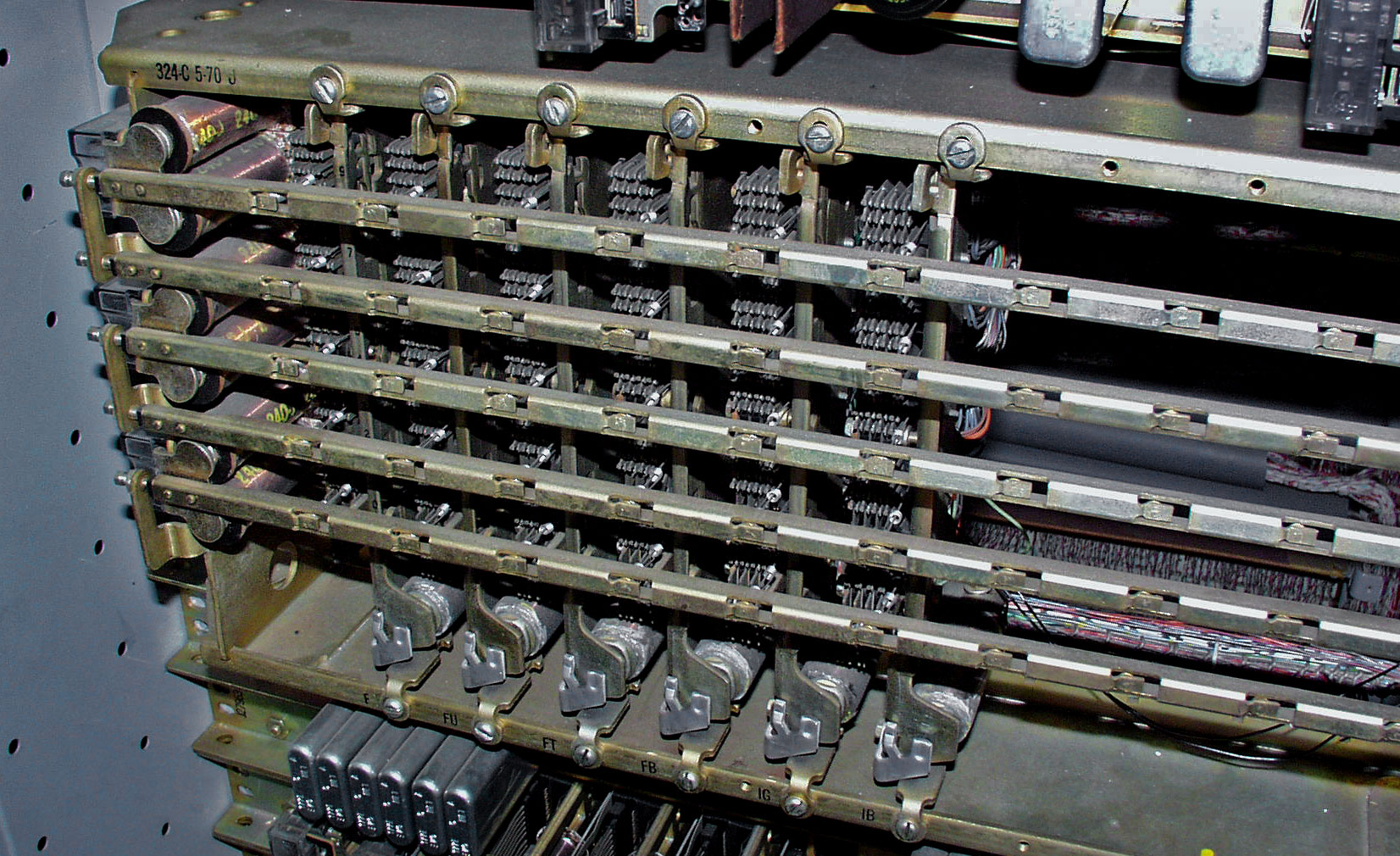
Revertive Pulse Incoming Register of 5XB switch. Each vertical unit, from right to left, counts, stores and converts one selection:Incoming Group, Incoming Brush, Final Brush, Final Tens, Final Units

Connection of trunks to incoming registers and outgoing senders is not through the four-stage voice fabric. Rather it is through a dedicated single-stage crossbar network known as incoming register link (IRL) or outgoing sender link (OSL) respectively. Registers and senders are in groups of ten, assigned one to each level of as many crossbar switches as are appropriate to the traffic they can handle. Different trunks are wired to different IRLs or OSLs depending on what kind of signaling they use; i.e. IRDP, IRRP (see panel switch), or IRMF.

Previous systems use relays in the incoming trunk circuit to control ringing and to return busy tone. 5XB uses a ringing selection switch (RSS): a crossbar switch with ten verticals, serving ten trunks. The various levels provide various tones, and ringing current of various durations and cadences (especially valuable for party lines). Levels 0 and 1 are used as discriminating levels to set polarity for selective ringing on tip side or ring side. An especially sensitive wire spring RT relay is used to detect off-hook from a line being rung, release the RSS hold magnet, and engage the shielded supervision relay so reverse battery answer supervision would be returned to the originating end.

== Common control ==
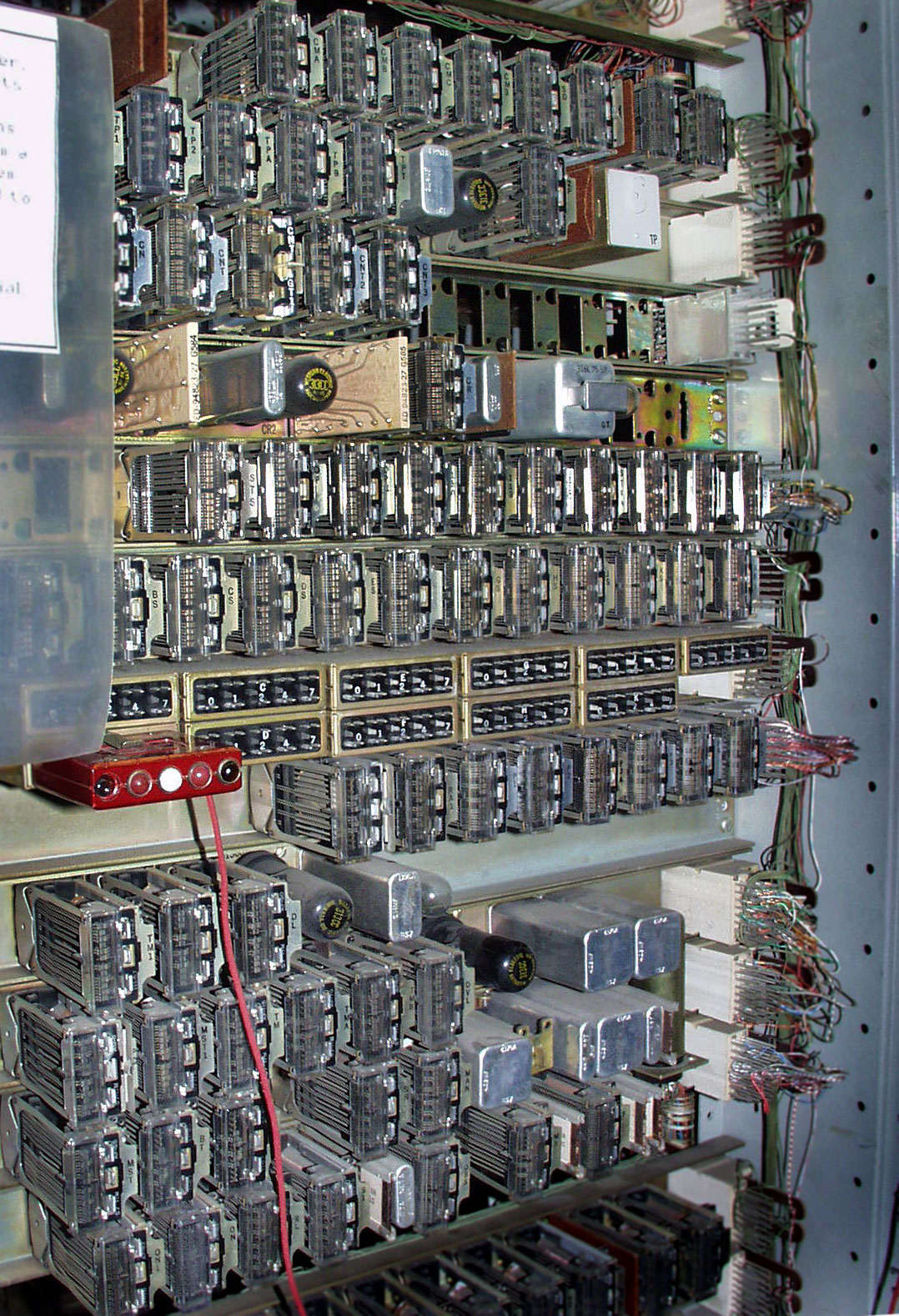
Originating Register, with reed relay reader by which a switchman can see what phone number is stored

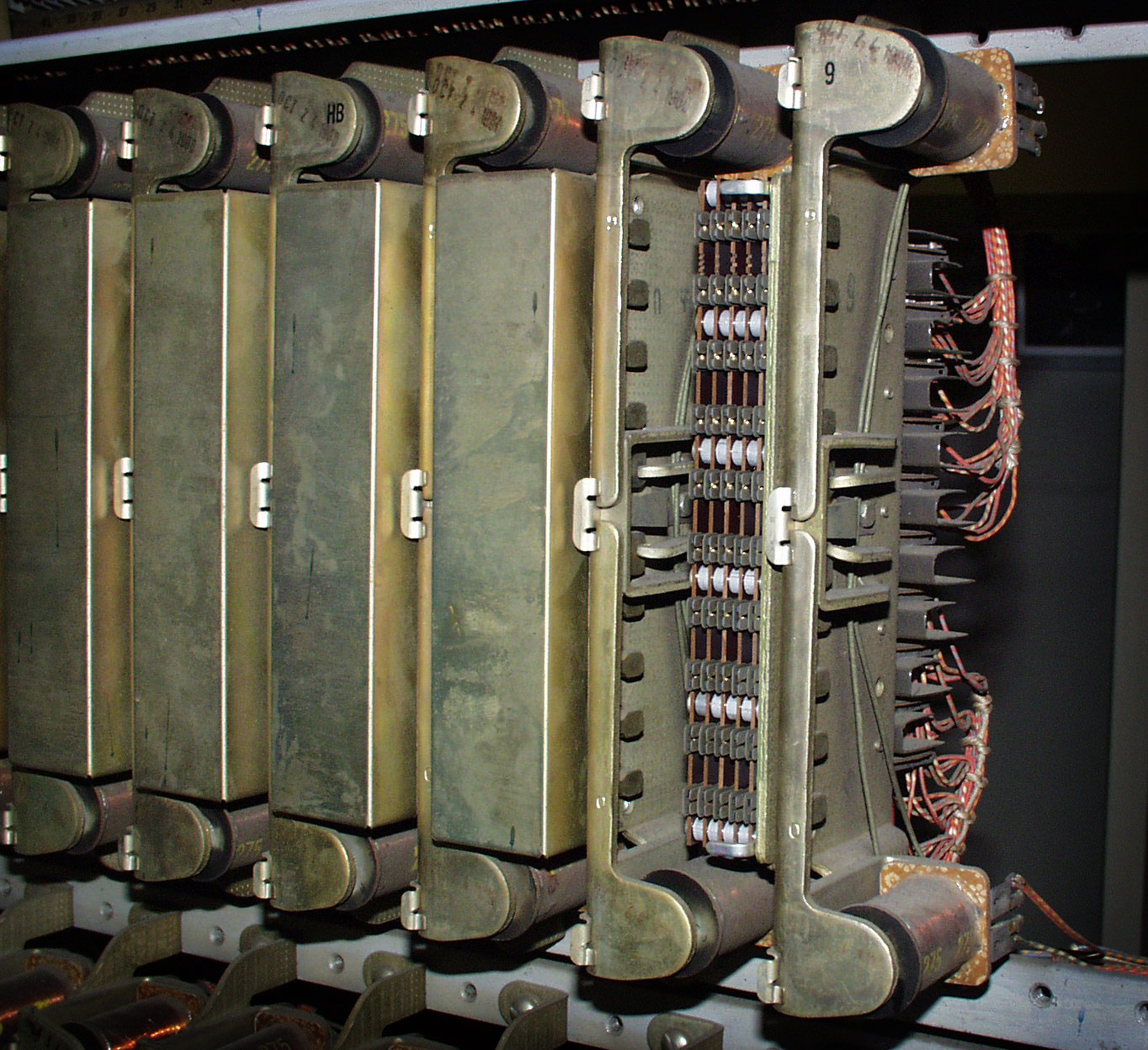
Flat Spring connector relays as used in mid 20th century 5XB

Call-back, single-train, and other sophisticated methods require more sophisticated controls, but they increased efficiency and became standard for later designs. 5XB also separates the registers for receiving digits from the senders for sending them. This complication necessitates more transmission of data among the control circuits but greatly shortens the holding time of senders and increases general efficiency and versatility without having to put the versatility into large, numerous, and complex senders as in earlier systems.

Originating registers (OR) are wired to the trunk link frame (TLF). In the original 5XB, a marker, once alerted to a trip condition, picks an OR by the same mechanism it uses to pick a trunk, identifies a clear path between line and OR, loads the OR with any information necessary for later processing (such as line equipment and class of service) and releases itself. The OR then receives the digits (rotary or tone), stores them in reed relay packs, and used the pretranslator to determine how many digits to receive before calling in the marker again to complete the call.

Larger 5XB systems were built in the 1960s with more markers. To save money the markers were separated into two kinds: simple dial tone markers (DTM) just to connect the line to the OR, and completing markers (CM), many times more complex and expensive, to complete the call to or from a trunk. CM has, among other features, the ability to translate the first 3 digits of a phone number (or 6 when using a separate foreign area translator) to identify the correct outgoing trunks and handling.

Connectors, similar in purpose to the data buses inside a computer CPU, connect the markers to the peripheral equipment. each connector is made up of large relays of 30 contacts each, to connect all the leads by which the marker would exchange information and control signals. For example, each of the oblong reed packs in an OR would have to be connected by five leads through the originating register marker connector to transmit the two-out-of-five code representing one dialed digit. For speed, transfer is entirely parallel, requiring many large relays to connect so many wires. Connectors that respond to a peripheral circuit's request for action are given the name of the requesting circuit and "marker", as in ORMC or IRMC. Connectors whose use was requested by a marker are named only for the circuit to which they connect, as in outsender connector, line link connector, and trouble recorder connector.

One of the drawbacks of step-by-step and other early systems is that the preference for choosing trunks or selector links is fixed, and the most preferred links are used more often, with the result that the same faulty hardware blocks repeated call attempts until it is removed from service. 5XB markers were designed to rotate preferences in such a way that it is highly unlikely that the same circuit elements will be used in the next call. Thus, if a call encounters an equipment problem, a second try will probably succeed.

Partly because of this deliberate design decision to help shield users from component failures, the few shared markers contain a great deal of self-checking circuitry. This is feasible because there are only a few markers, and beneficial because their correct function was critical. Digit codes, for instance, are checked to ensure that exactly two out of the five lines are activated. When the built-in self-test circuits of a marker detect an error, a large punch card is produced at the test station recording the failure in order to assist the switchmen in detecting it and diagnosing the source. The card punch, with some cards, is visible in the lower left of the test frame picture below.

== Testing ==
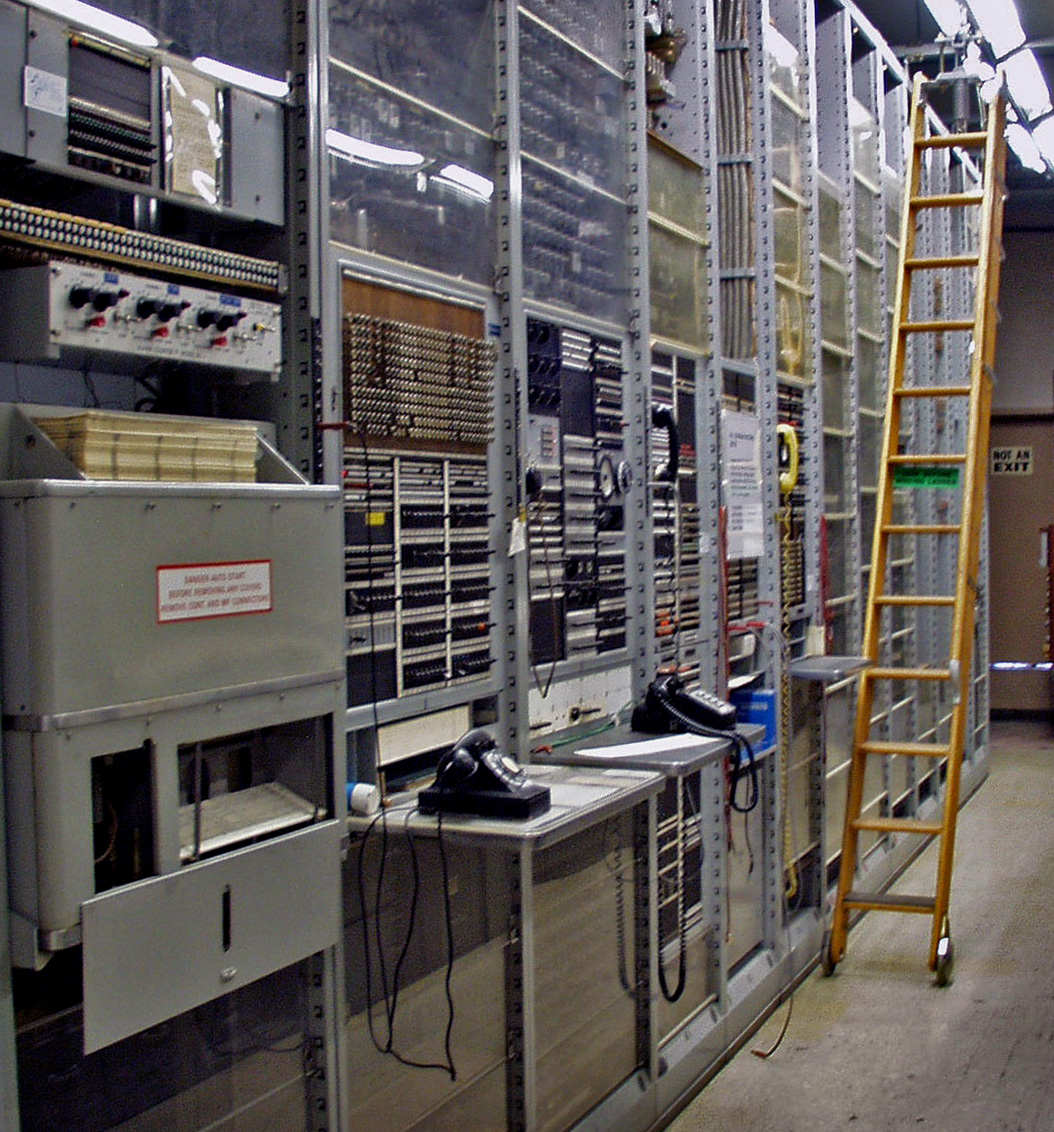
Master Test Frame, 1960s version with locking-key entry for phone numbers to be tested

To a greater degree than in previous designs, test facilities are centralized into a master test frame (MTF). This complex piece of equipment is wired into all common control equipment, and can, for example, automatically exercise the abilities of digit receivers to operate at different speeds, voltages, and other parameters. The MTF can select particular outgoing trunks, including testing the ability of the markers to select different lines to particular trunks. This test facility became more valuable as Centrex, direct distance dialing, and other innovations brought more complications to the tasks of translation and trunk selection. When used for testing lines, the MTF can test translations and conduct voltmeter tests to detect impedance imbalances and other electrical conditions that can impair service.

Other test equipment includes a line insulation test frame and an automatic trunk test frame. The latter was operated via a Teletype tape reader, and conducted trunk tests based on instructions encoded in 5-level punched tape. An automated AMA translator test frame checked for mis-wiring that could cause billing errors. A non-automated outgoing trunk test panel allows voltmeter, and signaling checks on trunks to distant offices, freeing the MTF from this tedious job. Each outgoing trunk is represented by two jacks: one for test access for the voltmeter and sender circuits, and one for the make-busy operation. The master test frame was able to override a made-busy status when necessary.

== Advanced services ==
The first office capable of international direct distance dialing (IDDD) in the United States was the LT-1 exchange on the 10th floor of the 435 West 50th Street exchange building in Manhattan, New York. A group of its MF senders was equipped for the unique dual outpulse requirements of that service. Most large new urban 5XB in subsequent years had IDDD, and it was retrofitted to some existing ones, but most omitted the dual outpulse capability, that job being handled by TSPS.

Also taking advantage of the superior versatility of 5XB, Centrex was invented as a service package. Later stored program control exchanges allowed more extensive service features. Autovon originally used a four-wire version of 5XB, with a more complex marker to implement its nonhierarchical polygrid routing system. Trunk circuits had additional logic and data storage built in, to implement multilevel precedence and preemption.

Picturephone arrived in the early 1970s. 1ESS switch was already going into service and provided a more sophisticated basis for advanced services, but was not yet as widely available, so 5XB was designated as the switching vehicle. Every Picturephone line has six wires: the old talking pair plus a video transmission pair and a video receiving pair. A new wideband switching fabric was designed using a 6-wire version of Type B crossbar switches, two of the wires being grounded, thus diminishing crosstalk for the two video pairs. When completing a Picturephone call, the completing marker first picked the line or trunk to which the audio portion of the call would be completed, and then set up both the audio switches and the video ones. Wideband remote switches (WBRS) were installed in smaller exchanges, as video concentrators for lines that were beyond video range from a larger exchange that had been given the Picturephone feature.

== See also ==
- Panel switch
- 1XB switch
- 1ESS switch
