= Flying-spot store =

Optical digital memory device

The flying-spot store was an optical digital memory used in early stored program control components of electronic switching systems.

The flying-spot store used a photographic plate as the store of binary data. Each spot on the plate was an opaque (logical 0) or transparent (logical 1) area that stored one bit. Spots were read and written with an optical mechanism with an access time of ca. one microsecond. The optical system consisted of a cathode ray tube that functioned as a flying-spot scanner, the source of light beams produced on its face and focused onto the photographic plates with a system of lenses. A photomultiplier detected the light beam. The light beam could be split into several components to read multiple plates simultaneously, permitting the formation of a group of bits for each location.

A flying-spot store was the main permanent program and data memory for the first electronic central office installed on a trial basis in Morris, Illinois in 1960. The memory was organized as a set of nine photographic plates and permitted reading two spots per memory address, yielding a word size of 18 bits. For temporary data, the system used a barrier-grid electrostatic storage tube.

== See also ==
- 1ESS switch
