= Metering pulse =

In telecommunications, metering pulses are telephone signals sent by telephone exchanges to metering boxes and payphones aimed at informing the latter of the cost of ongoing telephone calls. Metering pulses are also known as billing pulses and tax pulses.

The properties of metering signals differ between the telephone administrations in various countries. Some systems use alternating current pulses superimposed on the direct current (battery) levels of the local loop, while others may use a reversal of tip-ring polarity of the wire pair. Common frequencies of the AC pulses are 50 Hz, 12 kHz, and 16 kHz, with typical durations of the signal varying from several tens to hundreds of milliseconds. 50 Hz pulses are applied to the telephone circuit as common-mode signals with respect to ground, as applying them differentially would make them audible for the talking parties as buzzing tones. The pulse amplitude (RMS voltage) is high enough to distinguish them from signals induced from mains electricity. 12- and 16 kHz metering pulses are applied differentially across the telephone circuit, as these frequencies cannot be heard by listeners with conventional telephone instruments.

Each pulse represents an incremental cost. For calls with higher billing rates, the exchange equipment generates metering pulses at a higher rate than during calls to cheaper destinations, or during periods of lower billing rates.

On residential telephone lines, metering pulses are not used to generate billing records, but serve to inform the calling subscriber with a visual display in form of a counter or advancing dial connected to the telephone instrument. In commercial pay station telephones and coin collectors, A.C. signaling pulses operate coin control.

== See also ==
- Automatic message accounting
