= Switched loop =

Circuit configuration

In telephony, a Switched loop is a circuit that automatically releases a connection from an attendant console or switchboard, once the connection has been made to the appropriate terminal.

Loop buttons or jacks are used to answer incoming listed directory number calls, dial "0" internal calls, transfer requests, and intercepted calls. The attendant can handle only one telephone call at a time. Synonym: released loop.

== See also ==
- Cord circuit
