= Junctor =

A junctor is a circuit used in analog telephone exchanges, including the Number One Crossbar Switching System, Number Five Crossbar Switching System, 1ESS switch and other switches.

In early electromechanical switches, a "district junctor" handled supervision and talk battery duties for outgoing calls, similar to the duties of the cord circuit of manual exchanges. The junctors for incoming calls were simple three-wire connections between the incoming frame and the line frame. In the later electromechanical 5XB switch, junctors only consisted of three wires to connect the two legs of a call: the line and the trunk, of which the latter supplied all talk battery and supervision.

Stored-program analog switches such as the 1ESS switch, had both simple wire junctors and circuit junctors. Circuit junctors were in the form of plug-in circuit boards to provide talk battery and supervision for intraoffice calls and were closely similar to intraoffice trunk packs, with two scan points and two signal distributor points per circuit, two circuits per plug-in pack. Wire junctors were two-wire connections between trunk nets and other trunk nets or line nets. When three-way calling was introduced, three-port conference trunks were used, which only appeared on trunk nets. All junctors appeared in subgroups of sixteen on plugs or jacks at the Junctor Grouping Frame, where, as many subgroups as required, were plugged into other trunk nets, line nets, or circuit junctor frames.
