= Marker (telecommunications) =

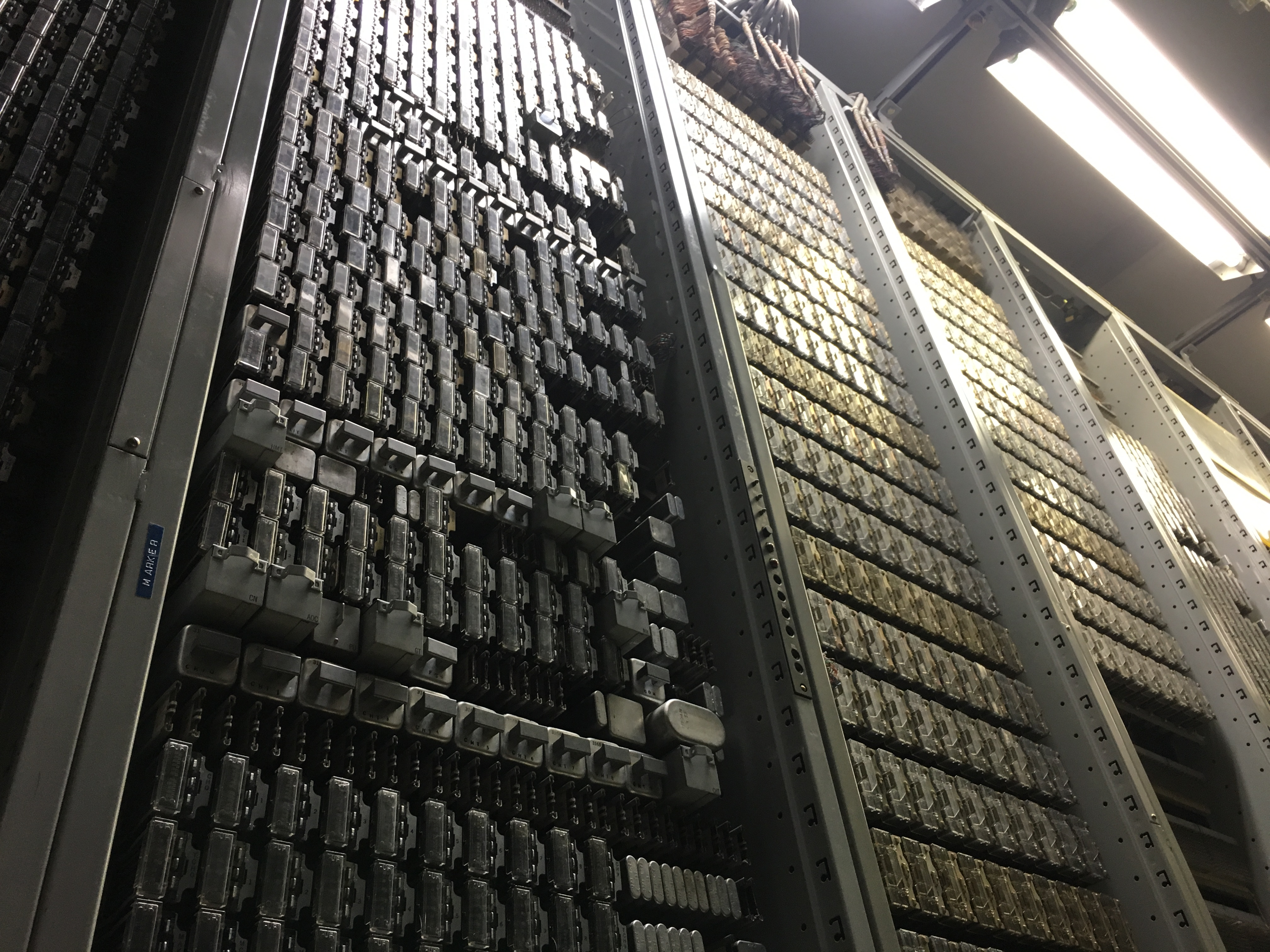
Part of a marker frame in a No. 5 Crossbar switch.

A marker is a type of special purpose control system that was used in electromechanical telephone central office switches. Switches employing markers belong to a class of switches known as "common control", as the purpose of a marker is to control the closure of contacts in the switching fabric that connect a circuit between the calling party and the called party. This is in contrast to "direct control" switches, where the switching elements were controlled directly by the customer's dial, such as the Step by Step switch. The term marker came from its use to mark a path of links through the switching fabric. A marker's comprehensive view of the switching fabric allowed it to find and assemble a path from one terminal to another, if the links were available, unlike the earlier graded progressive systems in which a path might not be found.

Markers were sometimes referred to as special purpose computers, but lacking stored program control, they were not computers according to the understanding of the middle 20th Century. After unfruitful German efforts in the 1920s, they were successfully developed at Bell Labs in the 1930s to support the then new generation of crossbar switches which were replacing the Step-by-Step switches and Panel switches of the first generation of automatic switching. First employed by the Bell System in the No. 1 Crossbar in 1938, the marker was a technological descendant of the decoder that was used previously in the panel system.

Markers were constructed from hundreds or thousands of relays mounted together in large frames. Different types of markers performed various specialized hard-wired operations. For example, No. 1 Crossbar switches had separate markers for originating and terminating calls, named "Originating Marker", and "Terminating Marker", respectively. No. 5 Crossbar switches had dial tone markers to select one of a number of shared digit receivers (termed originating registers) and connect it to a subscriber who wished to make a telephone call. The digit receiver collected the digits as the customer dialed, and made them available to the Completing Marker, which used them for routing purposes. In this case the Completing Marker would mark a proper path of idle links for the call to make through the mechanical voice switching matrix. Telephone switches that employed markers almost always had several of each type required by the machine. During normal operation, traffic load was balanced evenly among the markers. If one or more markers became unavailable due to a trouble condition, the load was directed to the remaining markers for handling. If momentary or intermittent trouble was encountered, a marker usually returned an error condition that instructed the equipment to try again using a different marker. This was done to ensure that calls still went through, even if the first try was unsuccessful.

Markers were used in the design of switches from the 1930s until the late 1960s when they were replaced with software controlled electronic computers of modern design.

During the middle 20th Century, markers in Bell System exchanges acquired other functions that were only needed once or twice per telephone call, including outgoing digit translation and enforcement of different policies upon different classes of service in the provision of features to customers. This practice evolved into Customer Groups, allowing the addition of Centrex features to the No. 5 Crossbar switch. These were the most complex markers made, and were abandoned in the 1970s and 1980s when Stored Program Control supplanted the marker as the primary method of controlling telephone switches.

Markers were mostly associated with crossbar switches, but many non Bell System crossbar exchanges did not use them. Where those exchanges had markers, for example in the British TXK or the Ericsson ARM, they were simpler in design and function. The digit translation jobs that were added to Bell System markers were handled by other equipment.
