= Erna Schneider Hoover =

American mathematician, software engineer, and inventor (born 1926)

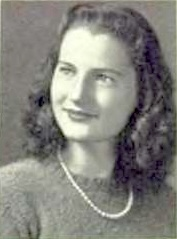
- 1944 yearbook photo
- Born: Erna Schneider; June 19, 1926 (age 100); Irvington, New Jersey, U.S.
- Citizenship: United States
- Education: Wellesley B.A.; Yale Ph.D.
- Known for: Computerized system for phone traffic
- Spouse(s): Charles Wilson Hoover, Jr.
- Children: 3
- Awards: National Inventors Hall of Fame, 2008; Wellesley College Alumnae Achievement Award
- Scientific career
- Workplaces: Bell Labs
- Thesis: An Analysis of Contrary-to-Fact Conditional Sentences (1951)

Erna Schneider Hoover (born June 19, 1926) is an American mathematician who invented a computerized telephone switching method which revolutionized modern communication. It prevented system overloads by monitoring call center traffic and prioritizing tasks on phone switching systems to enable more robust service during peak calling times. At Bell Laboratories where she worked for over 32 years, Hoover was described as a pioneer for women in the field of computer technology.

== Early life ==
Erna Schneider was born on June 19, 1926, in Irvington, New Jersey. Her family lived in South Orange, New Jersey and her father was a dentist and her mother was a teacher. She had a younger brother who died from polio at the age of five. She loved swimming, sailing, canoeing, and became interested in science at an early age. According to one source, she read the biography of Marie Curie which suggested to her that she could succeed in a scientific field despite the prevailing ideas about gender roles. She graduated from Columbia High School in nearby Maplewood in 1944, which would induct her into its hall of fame in 2007.

Hoover attended Wellesley College where she studied classical and medieval philosophy and history. She graduated from Wellesley in 1948 with honors, earning a bachelor's degree, was inducted into Phi Beta Kappa and was honored as a Durant Scholar. She earned her PhD from Yale University in philosophy and foundations of mathematics in 1951. Around that time, there were very few women who graduated with a PhD in philosophy (5%), compared to men.

== Personal life ==
While at Yale, she met Charles Wilson Hoover, Jr. She married him in 1953, during her three year stint teaching at Swarthmore (1951–1954). They had three daughters.

On June 19, 2026, Hoover turned 100.

== Career ==
Hoover was a professor at Swarthmore College from 1951 to 1954 where she taught philosophy and logic. However, she had been unable to win a tenure-track position, possibly because of her gender and marital status, according to one view. Her husband was very supportive of his wife's career pursuits. When they moved to Summit, New Jersey in 1954, for his new job at Bell Laboratories, she had difficulty finding a teaching job. Instead, she joined her husband's employer as a senior technical associate, and was promoted in 1956. According to one source, the internal training program was the "equivalent of a master's degree in computer science." Switching systems were moving from electronic to computer-based technologies. Problems happened when a call center would be inundated with thousands of calls in a short amount of time, overwhelming the unreliable electronic relays, and causing the entire system to "freeze up."

Hoover used her knowledge of symbolic logic and feedback theory to program the control mechanisms of a call center to use data about incoming calls to impose order on the whole system. It used computer electronic methods to monitor the frequency of incoming calls at different times. Her method gave priority to processes that were concerned with the input and output of the switch over processes that were less important such as record keeping and billing. The computer, as a result, would adjust the call center's acceptance rate automatically, greatly reducing the overloading problem. The system became known as stored program control.

Hoover's thinking about the invention happened while she was in a hospital recuperating after having given birth to her second daughter, according to several sources. Lawyers for Bell Labs handling the patent had to go to her house to visit her while she was on maternity leave so that she could sign the papers. The result of the invention was much more robust service to callers during peak load times:

To my mind it was kind of common sense ... I designed the executive program for handling situations when there are too many calls, to keep it operating efficiently without hanging up on itself. Basically it was designed to keep the machine from throwing up its hands and going berserk.

— Erna Schneider Hoover, 2008

For her invention, termed Feedback Control Monitor for Stored Program Data Processing System, Hoover was awarded U.S. patent 3,623,007 in November 1971, one of the first software patents ever issued. The patent was applied for in 1967 and issued in 1971. As a result of her invention, she became the first woman supervisor of a technical department at Bell Labs. She headed the operations support department in 1987. The principles of her invention are still being used in telecommunications equipment in the 21st century.

Hoover worked on various high-level applications such as research radar control programs of the Safeguard anti-ballistic missile system, which were systems to intercept incoming intercontinental ballistic missile warheads. Her department worked on artificial intelligence methods, large databases, and transactional software to support large telephone networks. She worked at Bell Labs for 32 years until retiring in 1987. In addition, she served on the boards of higher education organizations in New Jersey. As a member of the board of Trustees of The College of New Jersey, she was described as a visionary who was instrumental in increasing women faculty as well as enrolling the "best prepared high school graduates" in the state, and she helped build the college into a respected institution of higher education by lobbying extensively for state funding.

== Awards ==
She was awarded one of the first patents for computer software. She was elected as a member of the National Inventors Hall of Fame in 2008. She received the Wellesley College alumni achievement award. In 2020, the College of New Jersey awarded her an honorary degree for services to higher education in New Jersey, after her time on their board. Schneider Hoover was the recipient of the National Center for Women & Information Technology's 2023 Pioneer Award.

Her invention laid the groundwork for modern interconnected communication systems. While her initial system has evolved and integrated with other advancements, the fundamental principles of automated telephone switching systems persist. The legacy of Erna Schneider Hoover's work endures in the communication networks that underpin contemporary society, particularly in business-to-customer interactions. Her life's work not only transformed the telecommunications industry but also paved the way for future generations of women in science and technology.
