= Reed relay =

Electromagnetic switching device

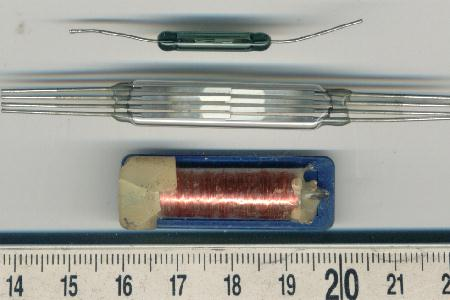
(from top) Single-pole reed switch, four-pole reed switch and single-pole reed relay. Scale in centimeters.

A reed relay (Note: Historically, the term Herkon relay was occasionally referred to as synonymous to reed relay even in the literature. "Herkon" was actually a SEL/ITT trademark standing for "hermetically sealed contact".) is a type of relay that uses an electromagnet to control one or more reed switches. The contacts are of magnetic material and the electromagnet acts directly on them without requiring an armature to move them. Sealed in a long, narrow glass tube, the contacts are protected from corrosion. The glass envelope may contain multiple reed switches or multiple reed switches can be inserted into a single bobbin and actuate simultaneously. Reed switches have been manufactured since the 1930s.

Compared with armature-based relays, reed relays can switch much faster, as the moving parts are small and lightweight, although switch bounce is still present. Also, they require less operating power and have lower contact capacitance. Their current handling capacity is limited but, with appropriate contact materials, they are suitable for "dry" switching applications. They are mechanically simple, making for reliability and long life.

== Memory device ==
A few million reed relays were used from the 1930s to the 1960s for memory functions in Bell System electromechanical telephone exchanges. Often a multiple-reed relay was used, with one of the reeds latching the relay, and the other or others performing logic or memory functions. Most reed relays in the crossbar switching systems of the 1940s through the 1970s were packaged in groups of five. Such a "reed pack" was able to store one decimal digit, encoded in a two-out-of-five code (74210 code variant) for easy validity checking by wire spring relay logic.

Such an electrically latching reed relay requires continuous power to maintain state, unlike magnetically latching relays, such as ferreed (ferrite and reed relay) or the later remreed (remanent reed relay).

== Crosspoint switch ==
In the Bell System Stored Program Control exchange systems of the 1970s, reed relays were no longer needed for data storage, but tens of millions of them were packaged in arrays for voice path switching. In the 1ESS switch, the cores were made of a magnetically remanent alloy, so the relay could latch magnetically instead of latching electrically. This "Ferreed" method reduced power consumption and allowed both contacts to be used for voice path. The coils were wired for coincident current selection similar to a magnetic-core memory, so operating the contacts for one crosspoint would release the other crosspoints in its row and column.

Each input of the array had, besides the two talk wires, a P lead for controlling the crosspoints on that level. Two coils on each crosspoint were wired in series with all the others on that level, to the P lead. Each output of the array also had a P lead with two coils on each crosspoint of that output level. The two windings controlled by the same level were unequal, and were wound around opposite ends of the reed, in opposing polarity. When a pulse passed through the crosspoints of a level, the two ends of each reed were magnetized north to north or south to south, thus repelled each other and opened the crosspoint in all except the selected crosspoint.

The selected crosspoint had current passing through both its input P lead and its output P lead, thus through all four windings. On each end of the ferreed, the windings provided by the two different P leads were opposed to each other, and the greater one predominated when both were energized. This being the input P lead at one end of the ferreed, and the output P lead at the other end, the two ends of that particular ferreed were magnetized north to south, hence attracted each other and closed the contact. Current was applied by the pulser only to set up the connection. The P leads remained dry and the crosspoint remained closed until such time as another connection was made involving one of the levels.

Because the individual crosspoints were more expensive than those of crossbar switches, while the control circuitry was cheaper, reed arrays usually had fewer crosspoints and were more numerous. This required them to be arranged in more stages. Thus, while a telephone call in a typical crossbar exchange like 5XB passed through four switches, a call in a reed system such as 1ESS typically passed through eight.

In the later 1AESS, the reeds were of remanent magnetic material. This "Remreed" design allowed further reduction in size and power consumption. A "grid" of 1024 2-wire crosspoints, arranged as two stages of eight 8×8 switches, was permanently packaged in a box. Despite the sealed contacts, plating with silver rather than with precious metals resulted in reed arrays being less reliable than crossbar switches. When one crosspoint failed, the grid box was quickly replaced as a unit, and either repaired at a local workbench or shipped to a repair shop.

Stromberg-Carlson made the similar ESC system, whose reeds were called crossreed.

Reed relays were extensively used in the British TXE family of telephone exchanges.

== Other uses ==
Reed arrays passed out of use in the mid-1990s, being unnecessary in digital telephone systems such as DMS-100 and 5ESS switch. Reed relays have continued in their uses outside the telephone industry, such as for automatic test equipment and electronic instrumentation due to their hermetic seal, fast operate time, extended life to 10^{9} operations and highly consistent contact performance. Reed relays have also found numerous applications in RF and microwave switching applications. They are also used in applications which make use of their extremely low leakage current (in the order of femtoamperes) such as photomultiplier detectors and other extremely low current handling circuits. Reed switches can also be manufactured to withstand several kilovolts and are still used as high-voltage relays in place of more costly sulfur hexafluoride or vacuum relays.

== See also ==
- Mercury-wetted reed relay
- PRX (telephony)
- Reed receiver
- TXE (Telephone eXchange Electronic)
- Vibrator (electronic)
