= Electronic switching system =

Telephone switch that interconnects telephone circuits

In telecommunications, an electronic switching system (ESS) is a telephone switch that uses solid-state electronics, such as digital electronics and computerized common control, to interconnect telephone circuits for the purpose of establishing telephone calls.

The generations of telephone switches before the advent of electronic switching in the 1950s used purely electro-mechanical relay systems and analog voice paths. These early machines typically utilized the step-by-step technique. The first generation of electronic switching systems in the 1960s were not entirely digital in nature, but used reed relay-operated metallic paths or crossbar switches operated by stored program control (SPC) systems.

First announced in 1955, the first customer trial installation of an all-electronic central office commenced in Morris, Illinois in November 1960 by Bell Laboratories. The first large-scale electronic switching system was the Number One Electronic Switching System (1ESS) of the Bell System, cut over in Succasunna, New Jersey, in May 1965.

Just three years later, in September 1968, Britain's Post Office opened the world's first all-digital pulse-code modulation (PCM) exchange named Empress (three decades after British scientist Alec Reeves had invented the PCM encoding system without the digital components to take full advantage). Other nations vying to reach the forefront of technical innovation would adopt metal–oxide–semiconductor (MOS) and PCM technologies to make their own transitions from analog to digital telephony throughout the 1970s. Later electronic switching systems implemented the digital representation of the electrical audio signals on subscriber loops by digitizing the analog signals and processing the resulting data for transmission between central offices. Time-division multiplexing (TDM) technology permitted the simultaneous transmission of multiple telephone calls on a single wire connection between central offices or other electronic switches, resulting in dramatic capacity improvements of the telephone network.

With the advances of digital electronics starting in the 1960s telephone switches employed semiconductor device components in increasing measure.

In the late 20th century most telephone exchanges without TDM processing were eliminated and the term electronic switching system became largely a historical distinction for the older SPC systems.

== See also ==
- List of telephone switches
- Stored program control
- 5ESS Switching System
