= List of telephone switches =

This list of telephone switches is a compilation of telephone switches used in the public switched telephone network (PSTN) or in large enterprises.

== American Digital Switching ==
- Centura 2000

== Alcatel ==
This lists Alcatel switches before the merger with Lucent Technologies.

- 1000 E10 / S12 (during the 1990s the E10 and S12 systems were converted into a single product line)
- E10 versions:
  - E10A (E10N3)- Original switch introduced in 1972 one of the earliest deployments of TDM switching in the world.
  - E10B (E10N1)- Major revision in the 1980s which eventually saw ISDN capabilities. Common in France, Ireland, China, India and elsewhere.
  - E10B3 - major revision in the 1990s. Common in France & Ireland
  - OCB-283 - Another name for more modern versions of E10B and often the name used in India to distinguish it from older versions.
  - E10-MT formerly Thomson MT-25 found mostly in France, and MT20 too.
  - E10-Five E10B adapted for the North American environment as a class-5 switch.
  - E10S satellite switching unit.
  - E10-MSC mobile switching center for GSM and other protocols.
  - 1000 (MM) E10 - Evolved switch for multimedia / broadband and IP network environments. Provides POTS/ISDN and next generation services.
- S12 - Formerly known as "System 12" or the ITT 1240 or acquired by Alcatel when it purchased ITT's assets in Europe. This is a very widely deployed switching system found in Italy, Germany, Belgium, Australia and many other countries around the world. There are a large number of versions of this type of switch ranging from local, to transit to international gateway to mobile switching centers. The line was converted with the E10 family of exchanges.
- OmniPCX Office
- OmniPCX Enterprise

=== Thomson ===
- MT-20
- MT-25
- MT-35

== Automatic Electric Co. ==
Automatic Electric started producing electromechanical switching systems in the 19th century.

- 32A42
- 32A44
- 35E97
- 370A
- 370B
- 375A
- 375B
- 385A
- 385B
- C1-EAX
- CXP5
- CXP5A
- EAX #1
- EAX #2
- EAX #3
- ESU 3072 Line
- FW1 (Four Wire 1 Toll Switch)
- GTD-3 EAX (Toll switch, NOT CCS7 capable although CCIS capable)
- GTD-5 EAX (Class 5 switch, many in use today, was the primary switch in former GTE exchanges. Now supported by Lucent.)
- GTD-120 Digital PABX
- GTD-1000 Digital PABX
- GTD-4600 Digital PABX
- OMNI-S1 Digital PABX
- OMNI-S2 Digital PABX
- OMNI-S3 Digital PABX
- Strowger Automatic Toll Ticketing (SATT); relay and type 45 rotary switch mechanics
- Strowger Step-by-Step (Strowger patents were exclusively licensed to the Automatic Electric Company).
- TSPS (Traffic Service Position System, obsolete system for operator handled LD calls.)
- XPT No. 1
- 101 Director
- OXO
- OXE

== Avaya ==
- Currently Available Avaya Switches
  - Application Server 5300 (AS5300)
  - Aura
  - Communication Manager
  - S8800
  - S8730
  - S8510
  - S8400
  - S8300D
  - INDeX
  - IP Office 500v2
- Discontinued Avaya Switches
  - 1A2 Key System (Electro-mechanical Key System made by Western Electric)
  - DEFINITY BCS (Business Communications System)
  - DEFINITY ECS (Enterprise Communications Server)
  - DEFINITY G3R (RISC processor)
  - DEFINITY Communications System Generic 2 (Formerly, System 85)
  - DEFINITY Communications System Generic 3 (Formerly System 75)
  - DIMENSION (Previously made by AT&T)
  - G3MCC (Multi-Carrier Cabinet)
  - HORIZON (Previously made by AT&T)
  - MERLIN ("Classic"; 206, 410, 820. Originally made by AT&T)
  - MERLIN PLUS ("Classic", Originally made by AT&T)
  - MERLIN II ("Classic", Originally made by AT&T)
  - MERLIN LEGEND
  - MERLIN MAGIX, Integrated Communications System
  - PARTNER
  - PARTNER II
  - PARTNER PLUS
  - PARTNER ACS (Advanced Communications System), Replaced by IP Office 500 Partner Mode/Edition
  - PARTNER Small Office Edition
  - S8700 & S8720
  - S8500
  - S8300 a, b & c
  - SPIRIT
  - System 25 (Previously made by AT&T)
  - System 75 (Previously made by AT&T)
  - System 75 XE (Previously made by AT&T)
  - System 85 (Previously made by AT&T)
  - IP Office 400 (SOE, 403, 406, 406v2, 412), Replaced by IP Office 500

== BPL Telecom ==
- Sigma Indx-100
- Sigma Indx-150
- Sigma Indx-250
- Sigma Indx-2000

== GPO/PO/British Telecommunications ==
- TXS
- IAX5 Island Automatic eXchange No 5
- SAX Small Automatic eXchange
- UAX5
- UAX6
- UAX7
- UAX8
- UAX9
- UAX10
- UAX11
- UAX12
- UAX13
- UAX14
- UXE7
- UXE8
- TXK1
- TXK5 (Ericsson ARM200)
- TXK6 (Ericsson AKE)
- TXE1
- TXE2
- TXE3
- TXE4
- TXE4A
- TXE4E
- TXE5
- TXE6
- System X
- System Y (Ericsson AXE)
- UXD5

== C-DOT ==
- AN RAX
- MAX
- RAX
- TAX

== CopperCom ==
- CSX 1100
- CSX 2100

== Coral Telecom Ltd ==
- IRIS IVDX Cloud
- IRIS IVDX
- IRIS Lite
- IRIS NGX
- DX-2000
- SBDX

== Datang Telecom ==
- SP30

== DGT ==
- DGT3450

== Daewoo ==
- DTS-1100
- DTS-3100
- DTS-4000

== Dialexia ==
- Dial Gate VoIP Softswitch

== DIAX ==
- Dikon ISDN switch

== DSC Communications Corp. ==
DSC merged with Alcatel-Lucent

- DEX 200
- DEX 400
- DEX 600
- DEX 600E
- DEX 600SC

== Electronics and Telecommunications Research Institute (Korea) ==
The TDX switch was a joint project with Korea Telecom and four manufacturers, LG Electronics, Samsung Telecommunications, Daewoo Telecom and Hanwha Telecom.

- TDX-1
- TDX-10
- TDX-100

== Ericsson ==
- AGF
- AKE
- AR10
- ARB (telex)
- ARE11
- ARE13
- ARF10
- ARF101
- ARF102
- ARK-D (decadic signalling)
- ARK-M (mfc signalling)
- ARK523 (small minor switching centre)
- ARM20
- ARM50
- ARM 201
- ARM202
- ATE
- ATE-NB
- ATE-VB
- AXE (spc electronic 1976)
- AXE 10
  - AXE 10 Remote
  - AXE Local 7
  - AXE Transgate
- AXE810
- Business Phone
  - Business Phone Compact
  - Business Phone 50
  - Business Phone 128i
  - Business Phone 250
- CP-400 (crossbar)
- CPP (Media Gateway)
- MD110
- MX-ONE
  - MX-ONE Telephony Switch (TSW)
  - MX-ONE Telephony Server (TS)
- Rurax

== Excel Switching ==
- EXS 1000
- EXS 2000
- EXS 4000
- EXS 8000
- EXS 16000
- EXS 30000
- LNX 1000
- LNX 2000

== EFAR TELEKOM ==
- MS26
- MS38C
- MS48C

== ALKAN TELEKOM ==
- MS26
- MS38C
- MS48C

== Fujitsu ==
- C140
- C460
- Focus I
- Focus II
- Focus III
- Focus 50
- Focus 100
- Focus 196
- Focus 960
- Focus Elite
- FETEX 100
- FETEX 150
  - FETEX 150 Local
  - FETEX 150 Toll
- Essence 630
- Essence 650
- 9600 Series (Branded in Australia as Telecom 9600 series)
  - 9600VS
  - 9600S
  - 9600M
  - 9600L
- Coral (branded as Fujitsu in Australia/New Zealand 1996–2002, manufactured by Tadiran Telecom)
  - Coral FlexiCom 200 (formerly Coral SL, discontinued)
  - Coral FlexiCom 300 (formerly Coral I, discontinued)
  - Coral FlexiCom 400 (formerly Coral II)
  - Coral FlexiCom 5000 (formerly Coral III)
  - Coral FlexiCom 6000 (formerly Coral III)
  - Coral IPx Office
  - Coral IPx 500
  - Coral IPx 800
  - Coral IPx 3000
  - Coral IPx 4000

== Great Dragon Telecom (GDT) ==
- HJD04

== GEC ==
GEC later became Marconi (Britain)

- SE50 (4000-type in GPO naming)

== Hasler ==
List of the mainly electro mechanical switching systems from Hasler AG Bern, which were used in public telephone network in Switzerland for many decades. Hasler AG finally merged into Ascom in 1987.

- HS 25 (modified from the Ericsson OL-100 system with double relays and 25-point selector (Ericsson license), mainly used for small villages and towns in the counties)
- HS 31 (new developed register system, introduced in 1931, based on a new flat type relay and a 100-point two-motion selector, suitable for small and large exchanges)
- HS 52 (new developed register system, introduced in 1953, based on a new 120-point selector, which was in fact a 4 x 30-point uniselector with 2 x 4 brushes offset by 180°, no zero position)
- HS 52 A (new variant of HS 52 from 1973 with an almost full-electronic register evaluation unit called 'Umrechner', not processor based but centralized programmable by diode matrices)
- HS 52 B (Processor controlled multiregister system with identifier, but the relay and selector based coupling stage was maintained from the original HS 52 system)
- HS 68 (prototype of a semi-electronic switching system, based on adhesive reed-relays in the coupling stage. One sample system built but not pursued because of the arising PTT IFS-project)
- AXE-10 (digital switching system from Ericsson, initially built and adapted for the Swiss market by Ascom Hasler under Ericsson license)

The last HS 52 A and B exchanges were in operation until the end of 1997. The personnel-intensive electro mechanical systems were shut down prematurely then, due to the imminent opening of the telecoms market in Switzerland. The last AXE-10 local subscriber were migrated to VoIP in June 2020.

== Hitachi ==
- EX10
- HDX-10
- DX
- DX30
- DX40
- MDX
- HCX5000

== Huawei ==
- C&C08

== Hyundai Electronics Industries ==
- HDX-300
- HDX-2000

== Indian Telephone Industries Limited ==
- ESAX 200
- ILT-512
- ILT-2048
- MILT-64

== Inventel ==
- ACT6000

== Iskratel ==
- SI2000
- SI3000

== Italtel ==
- CT1
- CT2
- CIMA
- UT10
- UT20
- TN16
- UT100
- iMSS (Italtel Multi Service Solution), a.k.a. i-SSW
- i-VLS (Italtel Virtual Lite Switch)
- i-MCS (Italtel Multimedia Communications Suite) - NGN Class 4 and Class 5 SoftSwitch + IMS Core + TAS for delivery of POTS/ISDN/SIP services over legacy and IP Broadband access type networks
- i-RPS (Italtel Routing Policy Server) - Centralized Routing Platform for IP Convergent Networks

== ITEC ==
- EMS-1 (The ITEC Electronic Modular Switch is an electronic direct control switching system. The modules are combined to form a complete switch or any of the modules can be added to your present Step-by-Step Systems.)
- EMS-2 (The EMS-2 RURAL SWITCH is a stored program control analog switch designed to be cost-effective in small exchanges. The modular design with connectorized cabling permits fast initial installation and growth. The system requires minimum maintenance and is particularly suitable for unattended exchanges. The EMS-2 distributed control design prevents total switch failure which could isolate a remote community.)
- IDS (Integrated Digital System)

== ITT Corporation (Includes ITT-Kellogg) ==
- 1210 (originally North Electric DSS)
- 1240
- TCS5
- TCS2
- TE500A
- TE400H
- TE400
- TD100
- Kellex
- 7J
- 7X2
- 7X3
- 7XB
- A1
- A1-SPC
- CRX
- CSX
- K60 (ITT-Kellogg)
- K7 (ITT-Kellogg)
- K1040
- PC32B
- Relaymatic (ITT-Kellogg)
- TCS5
- TRS4
- AN/TTC-22 100 Line Automatic/Manual Military Tactical Switch (retired)

=== ITT (Europe) ===
- 7A, 7A1, 7A2, 7E (Rotary 'machine switching' system) driving system
- 7D (Rotary, for smaller/rural areas)
- 7B, 7B1 (Rotary, French adaptation)
- 6, 6N1, 6N2 (Rotary, French adaptation) step by step. Original R6 have not register
- Pentaconta (crossbar)
- Metaconta (SPC electronic)

== JS Telecom ==
(Later Bosch Telecom)

- JISCOS 8005
- JISCOS 8007

== KAREL ==
- MS38
- IPG Communication Platform
- IPG1000/500
- MS48C/128
- DS200
- IPS/400

== Kvant-Intercom ==
- Kvant (Квант)
- Kvant-E (Квант-Е)

== KD ==
- XE30

== Leich ==
- All Relay (TPS, or terminal per station)
- CS100
- CS200
- CX 2
- CX 6
- CX 90
- LXP-2
- LXP-3
- LXP-4

== LG Electronics ==
- STAREX-TX1
- STAREX-VK (VKX Ltd, Vietnam)

== LONIIS ==
- ATSC 90

== Marconi (was GEC) ==
- System X

== Metaswitch ==
- VP2510
- VP3510
- VP6010
- CA9020
- MG2510
- MG3510

== Mitel ==
=== TDM/Digital switches ===
- SX5
- SX10
- SX20
- SX50
- SX100
- SX200 D
- SX200 Light
- SX200 ML/EL/ELx
- SX2000 SG
- SX2000 S
- SX2000 Light
- GX5000L
- GX5000S

=== Hybrid or IP-only switches ===
- 5000 Communications Platform (formerly Inter-tel 5000 CP)
- SX200 ICP
- 3100 ICP
- 3300 ICP or Mitel Communications Director (MCD) MiVoice Business

== Motorola ==
These are Mobile Telephone Switching Office Cellular switches

- EMX2500
- EMX4
- EMX5000

== NEC ==
- Aspire
- Topaz
- C410
- C460
- NC10
- NC23
- NC100
- NC23SE
- NC230
- NC400
- NC460
- NA820
- NCA20
- NCX23
- ND10A
- ND10B
- ND20A
- ND20B
- ND20S
- NEAX-61 (K, L, M & S)
- NEAX-61E
  - NEAX-61E Remote
- NESXS (Nippon Electric step-by-step based on license from Western Electric)
- M100
- NEAX31 (Discrete Electronic CPU, 4-stage Crossbar switching fabric, PBX)
- NEAX12 (Analog / Digital Hybrid PBX)
- NEAX22 (Analog / Digital hybrid PBX)
- NEAX 2000/1000
- NEAX2400 (Fully Digital PBX)
- XN120
- NEC Univerge SL1000 (Small or Medium Sized, VoIP And TDM)
- Enterprise IP Systems
  - NEC Univerge SV7000 (Fully IP, VoIP and TDM) Pure IP Communication server
  - NEC Univerge SV8100 (Fully IP, VoIP and TDM)
  - NEC Univerge SV9100 (Fully IP, VoIP and TDM)
  - NEC Univerge SV8300 (Fully IP, VoIP and TDM) Pure IP Communication server
  - NEC Univerge SV8500 (Fully IP, VoIP and TDM) Pure IP Communication server
  - NEC Univerge SV9500 (Fully IP, VoIP and TDM) Pure IP Communication server
  - NEC Univerge 3C Pure IP Communication server

== Nika (Ukraine) ==
- ATSK50/200
- ATSK100/2000

== Nokia ==
- DX 200
  - DX 220
  - DX 220 Compact
  - IPA 2800

== North Electric (Galion, Ohio) ==
- CX "All-Relay Exchanges:

(CX evolved from the "Automanual" system designed by Edward Clements: "Clement eXchange" or "Community eXchange")

  - CX30 (30 line)
  - CX60 (60 line)
  - CX100 (100 line)
  - CX200 ("broadspan" up to 200 lines)
  - CX1000 (large CX expandable to 10,000 lines)
- MCX A version of the CX product line designed by F.R. McBerty after leaving Western Electric/Bell Labs and becoming President of North Electric.

The McBerty design used an early "wire spring relay" and welded piano wire interconnections rather than complex wire multiples. The system never achieved the reputation of the CX product due to problems with poor contact pressure in the interconnection relays. Despite its much lower cost of production and installation, the level of maintenance required to keep these systems on good order doomed this variation of the CX design.

- DSS1 (North's first digital switch for local exchanges)

This later was renamed the ITT 1210 product upon purchase of North electric by ITT.

- DSS2
- ETS4 (Large #4A-ETS class toll switch based on Ericsson "code switch")
- NTS4E (4-wire toll switch with Xbar switches and "Omni" processors)
- NX1 (Family NX1A, B, C & D; All based on Ericsson By-Path Crossbar license)

L.M. Ericsson purchased North Electric in the early 1950s and brought this Swedish design to North where it was reworked to conform to U.S. telecommunications requirements.

  - NX1D (Final production version)
  - NX1E (NX-1D with OMNI Processor for line/directory, trunk and number-group translation services)

The NX-1E was not a SPC switch, rather it was a conventional path controlled switching matrix with electronic processors (computers) replacing the control, route selection and translation (directory number to line ID) functions.

- NX2 (Family Small 90–1800 line CDO Xbar)
  - NX2 (Original design 1959–1960)
  - NX2A (Improved cabinets ~1962)
  - UN2 Electrically and mechanically the same as the NX-2A but with design modifications specified by United Telecom (United Telecom/Sprint/Embarq) when they acquired North from L.M. Ericsson in the early 1960s. The "United" version of NX-2A replaced the intercabling connection blocks with wire wrap connections so that switches could be installed or expanded without having custom cable harnesses provided by North Electric.
  - Switcher Family (NX-2A pre-installed in a trailer for rapid installation or portable/emergency use)
    - TSW Basic Unit with growth to ~360 lines
    - TSW2 Expanded unit with growth to ~1200 lines
    - TSW3 Jumbo unit with growth to system recommended maximums
- TSD (toll switch)
- AN/TTC-20 568 Line Military Fixed Switch (Used by US Air Force - only one was known in existence at Sembach AB, Germany) (retired)
- AN/TTC-30 568 Line Military Tactical Mobile Switch (Used by US Army and Air Force) (retired)

== Nortel ==
- Application Server 5300 (AS5300)
- Business Communications Manager (BCM)
  - BCM50
  - BCM200
  - BCM400
  - BCM450
- Nortel Norstar Key Systems
  - 308
  - 616
  - 824 Modular
  - Norstar CICS (Compact Integrated Communication System)
  - Norstar MICS (Modular Integrated Communication System)
- Nortel Meridian 1 PBX
  - Option 11/11E/11C
  - Option 21/21C
  - Option 51/51C
  - Option 61/61C
  - Option 81/81C
- Communication Servers (CS Systems)
  - CS1000 (22,500 lines 3200 trunks TDM and VoIP)
  - CS1500 (48,000 lines 8,400 trunks TDM and VoIP)
  - CS2000 Compact
  - CS2000 (180,000 lines 200,000 trunks TDM and VoIP)
  - CS2100 (230,000 ports, 125,000 IP phones, 150,000 analog telephones, 125,000 digital telephones, 200,000 IP trunks, 50,025 digital trunks, 32,000 analog trunks, 200,000 SS7 trunks, 4,093 H.323 gateways, 112,000 nodes per host, 99,999 ACD agents)
- Digital Multiplex System (DMS)
  - DMS-10 family
    - DMS-10 Carrier Class Switching System (320 ISDN PRI links or more than 20,000 lines) (First "production" class 5 digital switch installed in the North American public telephone network)
    - DMS-10 RLCM (640 line remote)
    - DMS-10 RSLE (520 line remote)
    - DMS-10 RSLM (640 line remote)
    - DMS-10S (super small DMS-10 for very small exchanges, less than 640 lines)
    - DMS-10M (prepackaged DMS-10, a Community Dial Office in a pre-packaged container/"box")
  - DMS-100 family
    - DMS-100 (large local digital Class 5) (also known as an SL-100 when used as CPE (Customer Provided Equipment or PBX service) also known as Centrex.
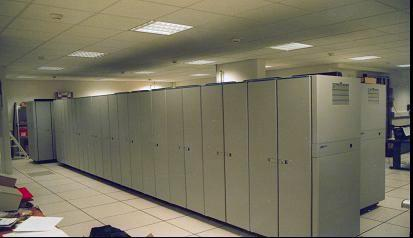
      A Nortel DMS-100e used by an operator to offer local and long-distance services in France
    - DMS-100/200 (local/toll digital more than 135,000 lines)
    - DMS-200 (toll digital)
    - DMS-250 (Equal Access Carrier Switch-digital)
    - DMS-300 (International Gateway Switch-digital)
    - DMS-300/250 (combination Carrier/International Gateway 70,000 to 100,000 trunks)
    - DMS-500 (Local/Toll + CLEC Switch)
    - DMS-Global Services Platform
    - DMS-MTX (Cellular MTSO)
- Stored Program (SP) (Electronic Stored Program Control using mini-bar switches)
  - SP1 2-Wire (Local)
    - The SP1 processor was constructed using Small Scale Integration (SSI) Diode Transistor (DTL) Logic. Two types of memory was used. Processor read/write scratch memory (called CALL STORE) was implemented using a magnetic core variant called Ferrite Sheet. Program and Data Store (used to store Software and infrequently changed data) was implemented using a technology called piggy back twistor - in modern parlance a write once, read many times non-volatile memory system). As was the case with the #1ESS systems, processors and memory were duplicated with automatic comparison of processing results and automatic recovery in the event that a mismatch was discovered. It did not however support the complex recovery mechanism provided in the #1ESS where a processor from one half of the complex could be connected to a mix of memory (both call store and program store) modules from both halves of the complex in order to achieve a working combination. Processor diagnostics would generally narrow a problem down to a board or three. Connection was made via a crossbar switch.
    - A SP1 2-wire variant was also available that provided Centrex services.
    - A version of the SP-1 ESS that could provide both 2 & 4 wire services was also built. The first instance was installed in Vegreville Alberta in 1976 or 1977.
  - SP1 4-Wire (Toll)
    - The first example of this switch was installed for Bell Canada, in Thunder Bay, Ontario in late 1973. It provided toll services for North Western Ontario and CAMA (Centralized Message Accounting) for the City of Thunder Bay. The City of Thunder Bay which operated its own Telephone Company installed a number of 2W SP1s.
  - SP1E (used NT40 processor which was later the first processor system for the DMS-100 Family of switches)
- NE-1ESS (Northern Electric version of Western Electric) #1ESS {licensee}
  - Bell Canada operated NE-1ESS 2 wire switches (some of which also provided Centrex services) in Toronto, Ottawa and Montreal. A 4W NE-1ESS was installed in Thunder Bay to provide telephone switching services (SAGE and AUTOVON)for USA and Canadian bases in that part of North America. The #1ESS was implemented using discrete diode transistor logic. A typical circuit board would implement a single 4 input "NAND" gate. Of the myriad of cards in the system - many were dedicated diagnostic gates. The diagnostic software had a very high (95% +) success rate identifying a single failing card. The success rate dropped quickly thereafter. Drifting Voltage Regulator cards caused a lot of angst.
- NE-4A (Northern Electric version of Western Electric) 4A toll {licensee})
- NE-5XB (Northern Electric version of Western Electric) #5Xbar {licensee})
- SA1 (Small Northern designed crossbar CDO)
- SA2 (Small Northern designed crossbar CDO)
- SF1 (Small Northern designed crossbar CDO)
- Norstar

== Nortel Netaş (Turkey) ==
- Elif I
- Elif I I
- DRX-4

== NTT ==
- D60
- D70

== Oki ==
- Discovery I PBX
- Discovery II PBX
- Discovery III PBX
- Discovery 8000 PBX
- D10
- D60
- D70
- KB270

== Philips ==
- UR
- UR NB
- UR49
- URVB
- UV
- PRX/A
- PRX/D
- is3000 TDM PBX
- SIP@Net Server Software PBX (owned by NEC )

== ROLM ==
- CBX (Versions 5,6,7000)
- CBXII (Versions VS, S, M, L 8000–8004, VL 9000–9004)
- 9751 CBX (IBM co-design) 9004/9005 versions (Models 10, 20, 40, 50 and multinode 70)
- 9751-9006i (Version 1–6; Also called Models 30 and 80); Sold also as Siemens Hicom/HCM300
- Redwood (limited key system)

== Spetstroy-Svyaz ==
- Proton-SSS

== Pupin Telecom (Serbia) ==
- DKTS 20
- DKTS 30

== REDCOM Labs ==
- TRANSip
- SLICE
- HDX
- IGX-A
- IGX-MT
- IGX-N
- MDX 10K
- MDX 384 modular exchange "stackable" to 384 lines/trunks

== SAGEM ==
- Eltex II (Telex)
- Eltex V (Telex)

== Samsung Telecommunications ==
- S-1240
- SDX-100
- SDX-200
- SDX-RB
- TDX-1
- TDX-1B
- TDX-10

== Siemens ==
- SD50 PBX
- SD192MX PBX
- SD232 PBX
- Saturn I PBX
- Saturn II PBX
- Saturn IIE PBX
- Saturn III PBX
- Hicom 100
- Hicom 150/150E
- Hicom 200 (Also sold as the ROLM 9200 CBX)
- Hicom 300 (Also sold as the ROLM 9751-9006i CBX)
- HiPath 3000
- HiPath 4000
- HiPath 5000
- HiPath 8000
- OpenScape SIP
- No. 16 Step-by-Step
- No. 17 Step-by-Step
- No. 51 Step-by-Step
- EDX-P
- EMD55
- EMD56
- EMD57
- ESK - CP24
- ESK - CP44
- ESK - CP44A
- ESK 10000 E
- EWSD
  - Remote Switch Unit RSU-DE3
  - Remote Switch Unit RSU-DE4
  - Remote Switch Unit RSU-DE5
- RCUB-800C
- DCO-CS (Formerly Stromberg Carlson DCO) - Sold to Genband in 2006
- HiQ8000
- SPX2000 (Formerly Equitel)

== Sonus ==
- GSX9000
- GSX4000
- PSX6000
- EMS 12000
- Topcom 601
- Topcom 200
- Hicom 300

== Stromberg-Carlson ==
- DCO 21
- DCO 80
- DCO 200
- DCO 360
- Century DCO6000
  - DCO Remote Line Switch 1000 (RLS 1000)
  - DCO Remote Line Switch 4000 (RLS 4000)
  - RLS 450
- DCO-SE
- DTM
- ESC-1 "Crossreed" electronic exchange
  - ESC-3
- MS30
- SC#5 (#5 Crossbar licensed from Northern Electric (Canada) for US sales/distribution)
- Motorswitch - Siemens (Germany)
- XY (Stromberg version of Ericsson "flat motion" switch operated in horizontal planes)

The DCO family starts as generic DCO

- DCO
  - DCO-E (Line Switch 10,000 lines)
  - DCO-SE (Line Switch 10,000 lines, software enhanced, class features, centrex, etc.)
    - DCO-RLS (Remote Line Switch, controlled by hosts above)
      - RLS 1000 (Pedestal mount cabinet 1000 lines in a subdivision - required multiple T-1's to host)
      - RLS 4000 (Same thing, but 4000 lines)
      - RLS (This has the ability in a host outage to make intra-cabinet calls)
      - The line switches will also talk to AT&T SLC-96 pedestals – 96 lines on a ped
  - DCO-CS (Long-distance, very limited lines – 1+ trunking to long-distance all T-1 cards)

Note: DCO systems are now supported by GENBAND

== Tadiran Telecom ==
- Coral FlexiCom 200 (formerly Coral SL, discontinued)
- Coral FlexiCom 300 (formerly Coral I, Coral FlexiCom 400 (formerly Coral Idiscontinued)
- I)
- Coral FlexiCom 5000 (formerly Coral III)
- Coral FlexiCom 6000 (formerly Coral III)
- Coral IPx Office
- Coral IPx 500
- Coral IPx 800
- Coral IPx 3000
- Coral IPx 4000
- Coral ICE
- Coral Sea Soft Switch

== Telesis IP Santral ==
- Telesis IP Santral
- Telesis Px24-Mrx
- Telesis Px24N6 - Telesis Px24N7
- Telesis Px24Mr6 - Telesis Px24Mr7* Telesis Px24Mr6
- Telesis Px24Xr5

== Telrad ==
- TMX-10
- TMX-100

== TEMCCO (Iran) ==
- National Digital Switch (B-NDS)
- TEM X1000
- TEM X256

== Tesla ==
=== Step-by-Step ===
- P51 (PSTN switch, modular design expandable from 100 to 10000 lines per exchange)
- UTU (PBX, mechanical components identical to P51, but different signaling)
- USTD (PBX especially designed for Czechoslovak Railways, with 4-wire long-distance stages)

=== Crossbar switch ===
- PK 201 (PSTN Switch with R1 register signaling, not widely used)
- PK 202 (PSTN Switch with R2 register signaling, very frequently used in 80's)
- UK 101, UK 102 (PBXes up to 23 and 57 lines)
- UK 111, UK 112 (PBXes of higher capacities, expandable to thousands of lines)

== Tekelec ==
- Tekelec 9000 Distributed Switching Solution (formerly SanteraOne)
- Tekelec 7000 Class 5 Packet Switch (formerly Taqua Open Compact Exchange)

== Tropico ==
- Tropico C (Subscriber Line Digital Concentrator)
- Tropico R (Small Capacity Local/Tandem Exchange)
- Tropico RA (Local/Transit Exchange)

== VEB Kombinat Nachrichtenelektronik ==
- DVZ 2000 (space-division digital switch)
- ENSAD (time-division digital switch)
- OZ 100 D (96-line time-division digital switch)

== Veraz Networks ==
- Control Switch 5.8

== VESNET ==
- DRX-4

== Vidar Corporation / TRW Vidar ==
- IMA2
- ITS 4
- ITS 4/5
- ITS 5

== Western Electric / AT&T Technologies / Lucent ==
=== Panel ===
- Local Panel
  - Battery cut-off (BCO)
  - Ground cut-off (GCO)
- Panel Tandem
  - Panel Sender Tandem
  - Office Selector Tandem

=== Step-by-Step / Strowger ===
- No. 1
- No. 350A
- No. 355A CDO (Community Dial Office)
- No. 356A
- No. 360A

=== Crossbar switch ===
- Crossbar Tandem
- No. 1 Crossbar
- No. 3 Crossbar
  - No. 3 Crossbar 2-Wire
  - No. 3 Crossbar 4-Wire
- No. 4 Crossbar
  - No. 4A/CTS Crossbar (Card Translator System)
  - No. 4A/ETS Crossbar (Electronic Translator System)
  - No. 4M Crossbar
  - No. 4M ETS Crossbar
- No. 5 Crossbar
  - No. 5 Crossbar 2-Wire
  - No. 5 Crossbar 4-Wire
  - No. 5 ETS Crossbar
  - No. 5A Crossbar

=== Electronic switching systems / Stored program control ===
==== Space division ====
- Electronic Central Office, the first electronic switching system operating in a trial in Morris, Illinois from November 1960 to January 1962.
- No. 1 ESS (1ESS)
  - No. 1 ESS 2-Wire
  - No. 1 ESS 4-Wire
- No. 1A ESS
- No. 2 ESS (2ESS)
  - No. 2A ESS
  - No. 2B ESS
  - No. 2C ESS
- No. 3 ESS (3ESS)

==== Time division multiplexing ====
- No. 101 ESS, a TDM PBX system installed partly on corporate premises and partly in the central office.
- No. 4 ESS (4ESS)
- No. N 4 ESS (Note N stands for 'New') (4ESS)
- No. 5 ESS (5ESS)
  - No. 5 ESS CDX (Compact Digital Exchange)
  - No. 5 ESS-2000 VCDX (Very Compact Digital Exchange)
  - No. 5 ESS-2000 VCDX Remote
  - No. 5A RMS (Remote Switching Module)
  - No. 5B RMS (Remote Switching Module)
  - No. 5E XC (Extended Capabilities)
- No. 7 R/E (Revolutionary/Evolutionary)
- No. 10A Remote Switching System (10A RSS)

== USSR manufacturers ==
- AMTS-1M
- AMTS-2
- AMTS-3
- Кварц (Quartz)
- M-10C
- ATS-47
- ATS-49
- ATS-54
- ATS-K
- ATS-K4
- ATSK-U

== Yeastar ==
- S20
- S50
- S100
- S300
- K2
- P550
- P560
- P570

== ZTE ==
- ZX500
- ZXJ10
- ZXJ2000

== Other digital switches ==
- BZ5000 (formerly Batik Elcom 4KT from Batik/Zetax, Brazil)
- iGen
- PacketStar PSAX1000/1250/2300/4500
- Plexus/Lucent Gateway Platform/Lucent Compact Switch (formerly Telica Plexus 9000)
- Zetax ZTX610

== Other experimental or canceled switches ==
- Lynch LCS
- Mitel CX5000
- Collins Radio Corp. DTS
- Oresis ISIS-700
