= TRW Vidar =

American telecommunications company

TRW Vidar was an American telecommunications company, owned by TRW Inc., that made digital telephone switches from the mid-1970s to the early 1980s. They were the first, or one of the first, companies to make such a switch. Before being acquired by TRW Inc., they were known as Vidar Corporation and later, after a buyout, they were known as American Digital Switching.

== History ==
=== Vidar Corporation ===
Vidar Corporation was founded in 1959 and was headquartered in Mountain View, California. Its initial business focus was making solid-state electronics and related instruments for automatic control systems. By 1960 it was filing patent applications in the electronic instrumentation area. Its product line included temperature gauges and strain gauges.

By the mid-1960s it had added a manufacturing facility, in San Luis Obispo, California. Vidar Corporation frequently hired engineering graduates from Stanford University. During the 1960s, Vidar's products used analog circuitry, but they were beginning the switch to digital elements. By the late 1960s, Vidar was focused on making telecommunications equipment as well as components for data processing.

Vidar Corporation was acquired by Continental Telephone Corporation in May 1970 for around $20 million.

The Vidar subsidiary continued to focus on making telecommunications equipment. It had positive results in 1973, with profits of over $4 million on revenues of over $38 million, but in 1974 revenues fell sharply to $21 million and the subsidiary lost over $4 million.

=== TRW Vidar ===
The Vidar division was acquired from Continental Telephone by TRW, Inc., a large conglomerate in a number of businesses, in May 1975 for $14 million. At that point it became known as TRW Vidar; they additionally had offices in Sunnyvale, California, which after a while became their headquarters. Organizationally, TRW Vidar was part of the larger TRW Electronics organization.

TRW Vidar's first product was the IMA2 switch. It then produced the ITS-5 switch, which met the Class-5 telephone switch requirements, the ITS-4 switch, which met the Class-4 telephone switch requirements, and the ITS-4/5 switch, which included both functionalities. The market for the TRW Vidar switches was independent telephone companies, and among the more prominent users of the switch were GTE and United Telephone as well as Continental Telephone.

Computationally, the control processing for the TRW Vidar ITS switches was done by two Intel 8080 microprocessors, in a high use/low use, fault-tolerant configuration. According to recollections published in the Embedded Muse newsletter, the control code was written in the C programming language and cross-compiled to the 8080 from a PDP-11 minicomputer running Version 6 Unix.

According to a 1989 Orlando Sentinel story, TRW Vidar "installed the industry's first digital switch in 1976." TRW Vidar declared, in the January 1978 issue of SIGNAL Magazine, "The IMA2, TRW Vidar's all solid-state switch, in service since March 1976, is the first system in North America to operate integrated digital T-carrier transmission with digital switching." However, according to the website Telephone World, TRW Vidar "produced and demonstrated the first digital central office switch" but were beaten to an actual installation of a commercial production digital switch by Northern Telecom and its DMS-10, and the first commercial installations of TRW Vidar switches did not happen until 1978. Still another account is presented in the 1982 book Digital Telephony by industry author John Bellamy, which states that TRW Vidar's IMA2 was the first digital toll switch in operation but that the first digital end office switch was one from Stromberg-Carlson. In any case, TRW Vidar was certainly one of the first companies to produce a working digital switch for use in central offices.

By 1982 there were stresses within the telephony industry due to the breakup of the Bell System and the early 1980s recession in the United States. The Vidar business was characterized by large development and start-up costs and a low near-term size of the independent companies market. Moreover, the Vidar unit did not fit into TRW's strategic plans. Accordingly, TRW Vidar withdrew from active engagement in the digital switch marketplace.

In the view of several executives involved with TRW Vidar, the TRW parent never really understood what they had at the time. One such executive left TRW in 1979 and, partly inspired by the difficulties he saw TRW going through, co-founded The Santa Cruz Operation (SCO), which became the leading company providing the Unix operating system on Intel commodity hardware. As a result, some have considered SCO to have been an offshoot of TRW Vidar. The CEO of TRW Vidar offered to buy out the company almost as soon as it withdrew from the digital switch market.

The Vidar switch continued to be used by independent telephone companies for the next several years, however, although those companies were concerned about the level of servicing and support the switch would receive from TRW.

=== American Digital Switching ===
In 1989, a buyout actually took place. American Digital Switching came into creation as the result of a joint management-and-customer buyout of the Vidar switch business from TRW. This kind of buyout was unusual; the new firm, headquartered in Melbourne, Florida, was owned by three co-founding former employees of TRW Vidor, an investment firm, and some twenty-four different independent telephone companies. The new company's main product was developed as the Centura 2000 switch.

In 1996, American Digital Switching was acquired by Symetrics Industries, Inc. and began operating as a subsidiary of Symetrics. At that point American Digital Switching was described as "a provider of central-office digital switching systems and support services to telephone companies in rural communities." By the late 1990s, sales of the Centura 2000 switch were not growing.

The American Digital Switching subsidiary was still in business as of the year 2000. But by 2001 they were not, and what property American Digital Switching had remaining was put up at a Brevard County, Florida auction.

== See also ==
- List of telephone switches
