= Trópico Telecomunicações Avançadas =

- Company type: Private
- Industry: Telecommunications
- Founded: 1999
- Headquarters: Campinas, Brazil
- Website: tropiconet.com

Trópico Telecomunicações Avançadas is a Brazilian company in the telecommunications sector founded in 1999. It is the result of a joint venture between Promon and the Centro de Pesquisa e Desenvolvimento em Telecomunicações (CPqD) foundation and operates in the development of equipment for next-generation networks (NGN) and in the maintenance of technology developed by Telebrás.

Its equipment is present in the networks of the largest telephone operators in Brazil, such as Telefônica Brasil and Oi. Their good performance in extreme situations earned praise from the first operator.

The company was mentioned in Exame Magazine as one of the companies that most managed to innovate in Brazil. In another survey carried out by Monitor Group and Exame, the Vectura Platform products (Softswitch and Signaling Server) produced by the company were listed among the 25 most innovative projects in Brazil.

== See also ==
- List of telephone switches
