= Centro de Pesquisa e Desenvolvimento em Telecomunicações =

Brazilian research center

Coordinates: 22°49′00″S 47°02′41″W

CPQD is a Research and Development Center in Telecommunications and one of the largest Latin American R&D centers in Telecommunications and IT. Located in Campinas, São Paulo, Brazil, CPQD has operated as a contractor for institutions and enterprises in a wide range of fields: telecommunications, finance, energy, industrial, corporate and public administration.

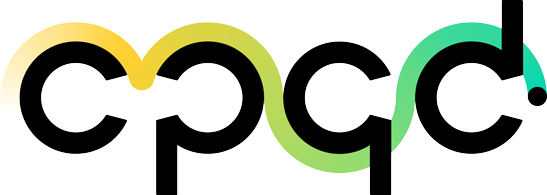
CPQD Logo

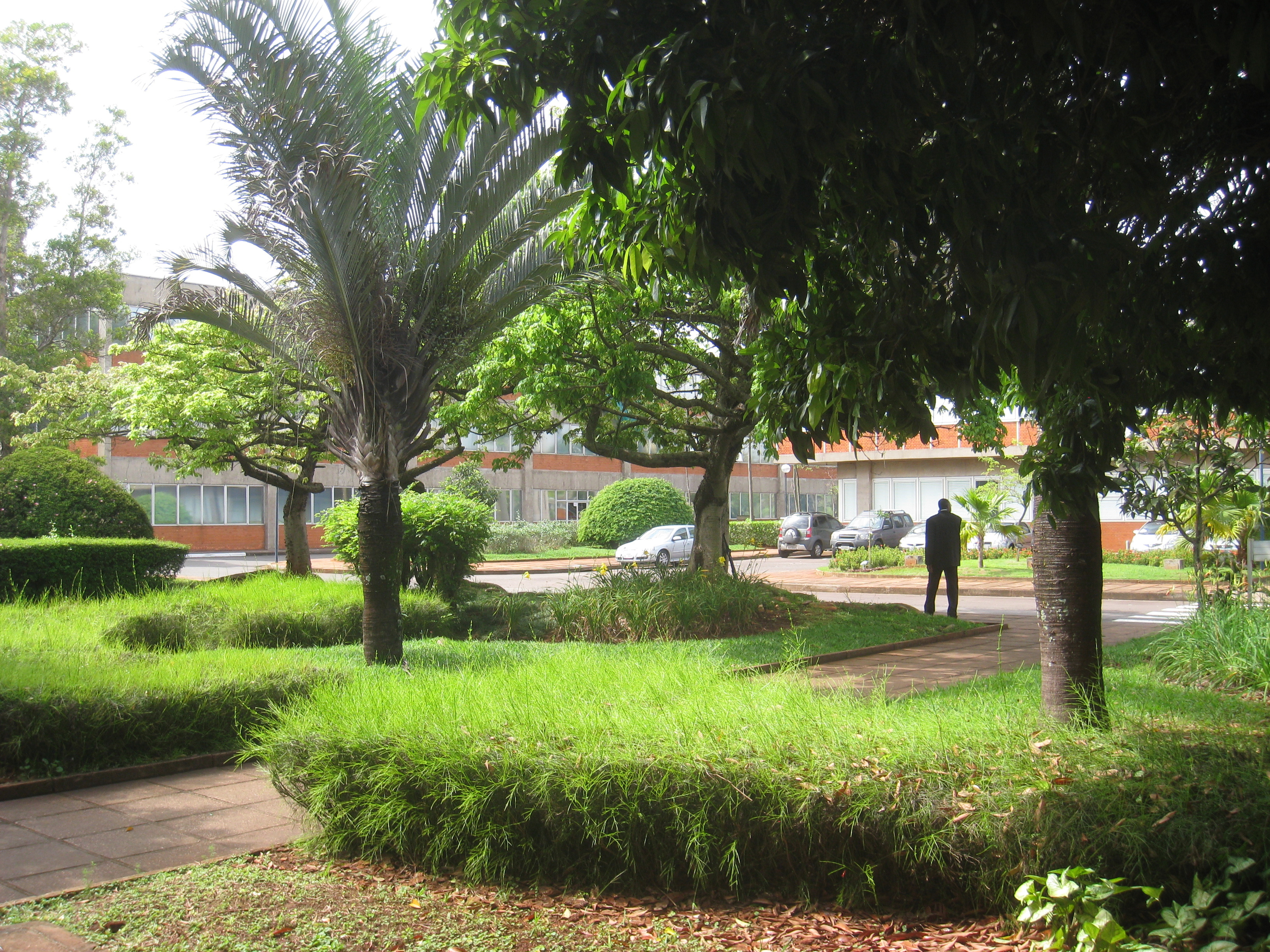
CPQD gardens

== History ==
CPQD was founded in 1976, as a Telecom research and development center for Telebras. In 1998, with the privatization of Telebras, CPQD became an independent Foundation.

== Selected projects ==
The CONVERTE Project, started in 2003 in partnership with Trópico Telecomunicações Avançadas, developed new technologies for convergent next-generation networks.

CPQD has participated in the development of the Brazilian digital television system (SBTVD).

The GIGA Project, developed by CPQD along with several other research institutions, is focused on the development of new technologies for high speed optical networks.

In 2013, CPQD made a partnership with the Brazilian Ministry of Defence to develop communication technologies for the Brazilian Armed Forces.
