= Crossbar switch =

Collection of electronic switches arranged in a matrix

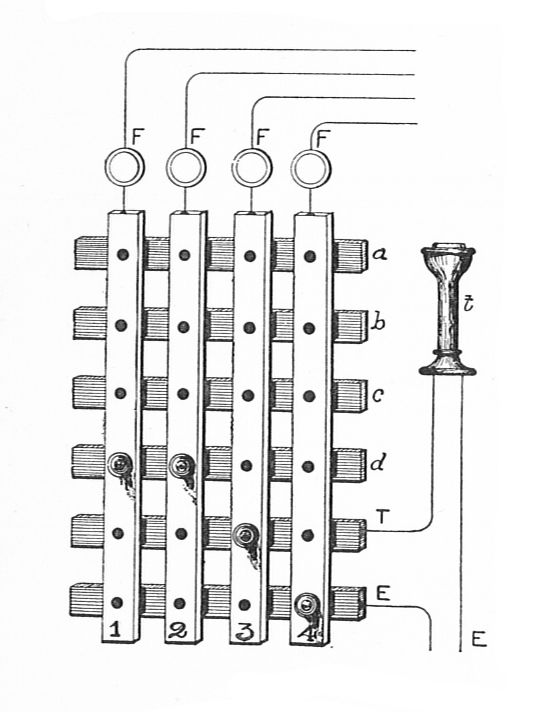
Crossbar telephone exchange of 1903 for four subscribers (vertical bars), having four cross-bar talking circuits (horizontal bars), and one bar to connect the operator (T). The lowest cross-bar connects idle stations to ground to enable the signaling indicators (F). The switch is operated manually with metal pins that create a connection between the horizontally and vertically arranged bars.

In electronics and telecommunications, a crossbar switch (cross-point switch, matrix switch) is a collection of switches arranged in a matrix configuration. A crossbar switch has multiple input and output lines that form a crossed pattern of interconnecting lines between which a connection may be established by closing a switch located at each intersection, the elements of the matrix. Originally, a crossbar switch consisted literally of crossing metal bars that provided the input and output paths. Later implementations achieved the same switching topology in solid-state electronics. The crossbar switch is one of the principal telephone exchange architectures, together with a rotary switch, memory switch, and a crossover switch.

== General properties ==
A crossbar switch is an assembly of individual switches between a set of inputs and a set of outputs. The switches are arranged in a matrix. If the crossbar switch has M inputs and N outputs, then a crossbar has a matrix with M × N cross-points or places where connections can be made. At each crosspoint is a switch; when closed, it connects one of the inputs to one of the outputs. A given crossbar is a single layer, non-blocking switch. A crossbar switching system is also called a coordinate switching system.

Collections of crossbars can be used to implement multiple layer and blocking switches. A blocking switch prevents connecting more than one input. A non-blocking switch allows other concurrent connections from inputs to other outputs.

== Applications ==
Crossbar switches are commonly used in information processing applications such as telephony and circuit switching, but they are also used in applications such as mechanical sorting machines.

The matrix layout of a crossbar switch is also used in some semiconductor memory devices which enables the data transmission. Here the bars are extremely thin metal wires, and the switches are fusible links. The fuses are blown or opened using high voltage and read using low voltage. Such devices are called programmable read-only memory. At the 2008 NSTI Nanotechnology Conference a paper was presented that discussed a nanoscale crossbar implementation of an adding circuit used as an alternative to logic gates for computation.

Matrix arrays are fundamental to modern flat-panel displays. Thin-film-transistor LCDs have a transistor at each crosspoint, so they could be considered to include a crossbar switch as part of their structure.

For video switching in home and professional theater applications, a crossbar switch (or a matrix switch, as it is more commonly called in this application) is used to distribute the output of multiple video appliances simultaneously to every monitor or every room throughout a building. In a typical installation, all the video sources are located on an equipment rack, and are connected as inputs to the matrix switch.

Where central control of the matrix is practical, a typical rack-mount matrix switch offers front-panel buttons to allow manual connection of inputs to outputs. An example of such a usage might be a sports bar, where numerous programs are displayed simultaneously. Ordinarily, a sports bar would install a separate desk top box for each display for which independent control is desired. The matrix switch enables the operator to route signals at will, so that only enough set top boxes are needed to cover the total number of unique programs to be viewed, while making it easier to control sound from any program in the overall sound system.

Such switches are used in high-end home theater applications. Video sources typically shared include set-top receivers or DVD changers; the same concept applies to audio. The outputs are wired to televisions in individual rooms. The matrix switch is controlled via an Ethernet or RS-232 connection by a whole-house automation controller, such as those made by AMX, Crestron, or Control4, which provides the user interface that enables the user in each room to select which appliance to watch. The actual user interface varies by system brand, and might include a combination of on-screen menus, touch-screens, and handheld remote controls. The system is necessary to enable the user to select the program they wish to watch from the same room they will watch it from, otherwise it would be necessary for them to walk to the equipment rack.

The special crossbar switches used in distributing satellite TV signals are called multiswitches.

== Implementations ==
Historically, a crossbar switch consisted of metal bars associated with each input and output, together with some means of controlling movable contacts at each cross-point. The first switches used metal pins or plugs to bridge a vertical and horizontal bar. In the later part of the 20th century, the use of mechanical crossbar switches declined and the term described any rectangular array of switches in general. Modern crossbar switches are usually implemented with semiconductor technology. An important emerging class of optical crossbars is implemented with microelectromechanical systems (MEMS) technology.

=== Mechanical ===
A type of mid-20th-century telegraph exchange consisted of a grid of vertical and horizontal brass bars with a hole at each intersection (cf. top picture). The operator inserted a metal pin to connect one telegraph line to another.

=== Electromechanical switching in telephony ===
A telephony crossbar switch is an electromechanical device for switching telephone calls. The first design of what is now called a crossbar switch was the Bell company Western Electric's coordinate selector of 1915. To save money on control systems, this system was organized on the stepping switch or selector principle rather than the link principle. It was little used in America, but the Televerket Swedish governmental agency manufactured its own design (the Gotthilf Betulander design from 1919, inspired by the Western Electric system), and used it in Sweden from 1926 until the digitization in the 1980s in small and medium-sized A204 model switches. The system design used in AT&T Corporation's 1XB crossbar exchanges, which entered revenue service from 1938, developed by Bell Telephone Labs, was inspired by the Swedish design but was based on the rediscovered link principle. In 1945, a similar design by Swedish Televerket was installed in Sweden, making it possible to increase the capacity of the A204 model switch. Delayed by the Second World War, several millions of urban 1XB lines were installed from the 1950s in the United States.

In 1950, the Swedish Ericsson company developed their own versions of the 1XB and A204 systems for the international market. In the early 1960s, the company's sales of crossbar switches exceeded those of their rotating 500-switching system, as measured in the number of lines. Crossbar switching quickly spread to the rest of the world, replacing most earlier designs like the Strowger (step-by-step) and Panel systems in larger installations in the U.S. Graduating from entirely electromechanical control on introduction, they were gradually elaborated to have full electronic control and a variety of calling features including short-code and speed-dialing. In the UK the Plessey Company produced a range of TXK crossbar exchanges, but their widespread rollout by the British Post Office began later than in other countries, and then was inhibited by the parallel development of TXE reed relay and electronic exchange systems, so they never achieved a large number of customer connections although they did find some success as tandem switch exchanges.

Crossbar switches use switching matrices made from a two-dimensional array of contacts arranged in an x–y format. These switching matrices are operated by a series of horizontal bars arranged over the contacts. Each such select bar can be rocked up or down by electromagnets to provide access to two levels of the matrix. A second set of vertical hold bars is set at right angles to the first (hence the name, "crossbar") and also operated by electromagnets. The select bars carry spring-loaded wire fingers that enable the hold bars to operate the contacts beneath the bars. When the select and then the hold electromagnets operate in sequence to move the bars, they trap one of the spring fingers to close the contacts beneath the point where two bars cross. This then makes the connection through the switch as part of setting up a calling path through the exchange. Once connected, the select magnet is then released so it can use its other fingers for other connections, while the hold magnet remains energized for the duration of the call to maintain the connection. The crossbar switching interface was referred to as the TXK or TXC (telephone exchange crossbar) switch in the UK.

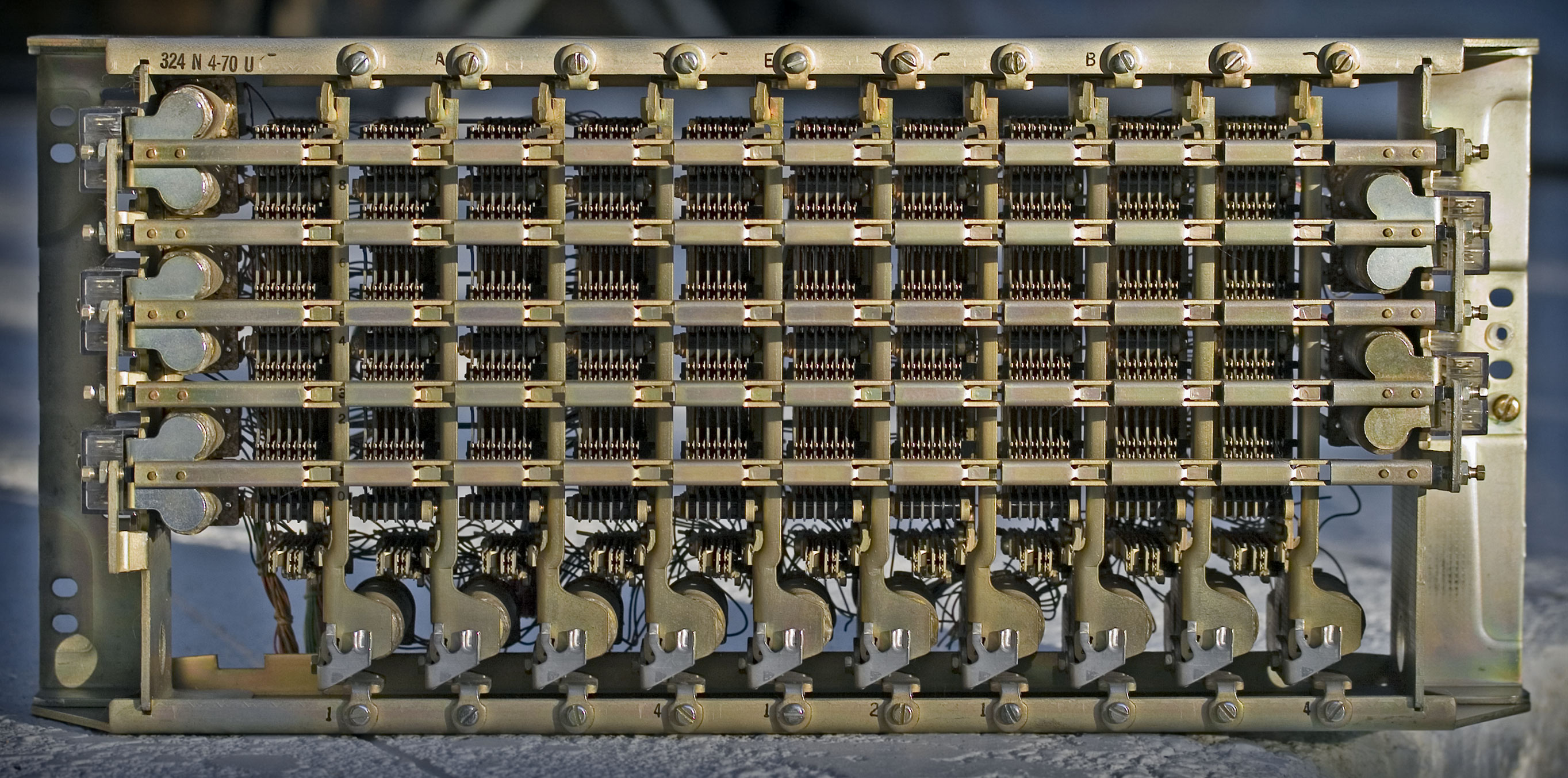
Western Electric 100-point six-wire Type B crossbar switch

However, the Bell System Type B crossbar switch of the 1960s was made in the largest quantity. The majority were 200-point switches, with twenty verticals and ten levels of three wires. Each select bar carries ten fingers so that any of the ten circuits assigned to the ten verticals can connect to either of two levels. Five select bars, each able to rotate up or down, mean a choice of ten links to the next stage of switching. Each crosspoint in this particular model connected six wires. The vertical off-normal contacts next to the hold magnets are lined up along the bottom of the switch. They perform logic and memory functions, and the hold bar keeps them in the active position as long as the connection is up. The horizontal off-normals on the sides of the switch are activated by the horizontal bars when the butterfly magnets rotate them. This only happens while the connection is being set up, since the butterflies are only energized then.

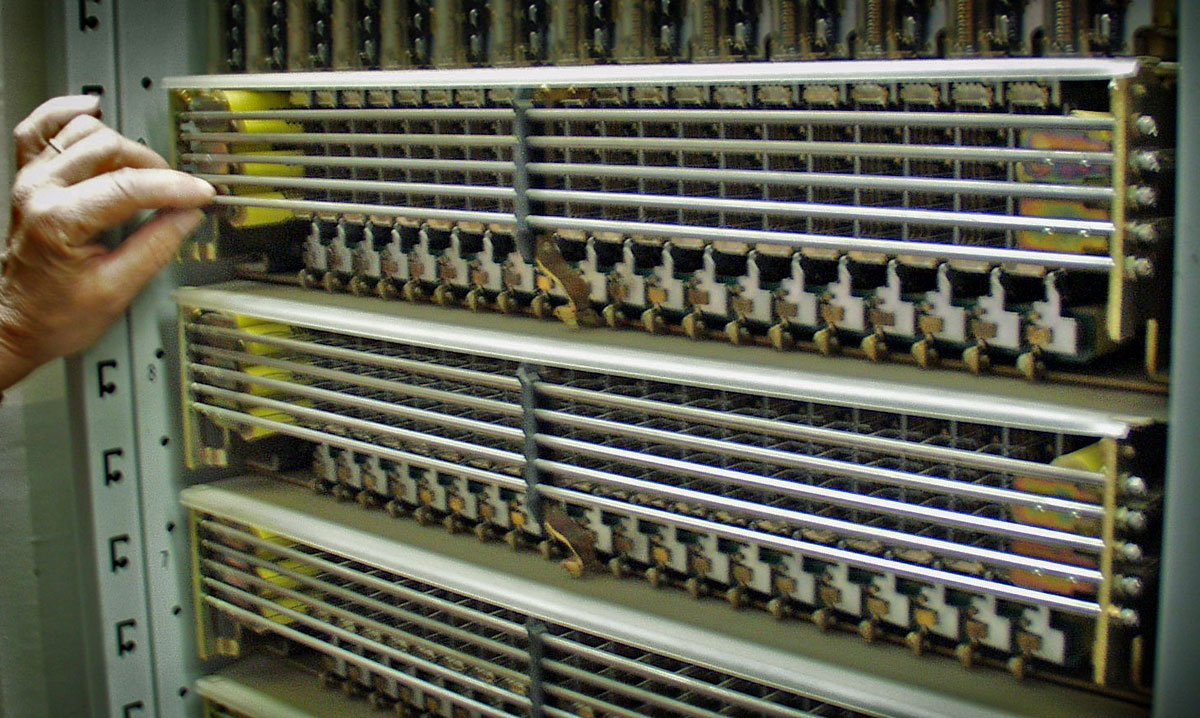
Late-model Western Electric crossbar switch

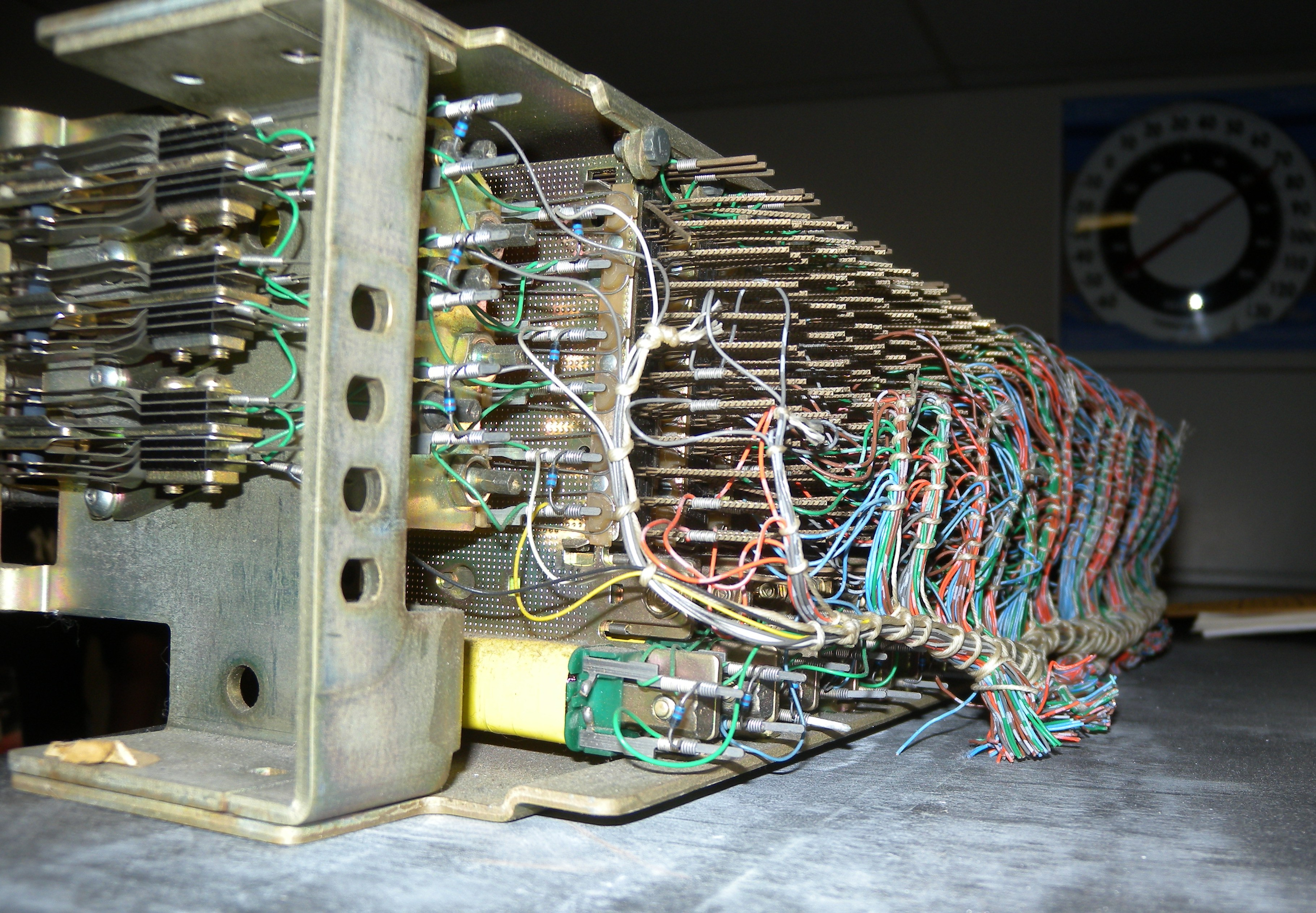
Back of Type C

The majority of Bell System switches were made to connect three wires including the tip and ring of a balanced pair circuit and a sleeve lead for control. Many connected six wires, either for two distinct circuits or for a four wire circuit or other complex connection. The Bell System Type C miniature crossbar of the 1970s was similar, but the fingers projected forward from the back and the select bars held paddles to move them. The majority of type C had twelve levels; these were the less common ten level ones. The Northern Electric Minibar used in SP1 switch was similar but even smaller. The ITT Pentaconta Multiswitch of the same era had usually 22 verticals, 26 levels, and six to twelve wires. Ericsson crossbar switches sometimes had only five verticals.

=== Instrumentation ===
For instrumentation use, James Cunningham, Son and Company made high-speed, very-long-life crossbar switches with physically small mechanical parts which permitted faster operation than telephone-type crossbar switches. Many of their switches had the mechanical Boolean AND function of telephony crossbar switches, but other models had individual relays (one coil per crosspoint) in matrix arrays, connecting the relay contacts to [x] and [y] buses. These latter types were equivalent to separate relays; there was no logical AND function built in. Cunningham crossbar switches had precious-metal contacts capable of handling millivolt signals.

=== Telephone exchange ===
Early crossbar exchanges were divided into an originating side and a terminating side, while the later and prominent Canadian and US SP1 switch and 5XB switch were not. When a user picked up the telephone handset, the resulting line loop operating the user's line relay caused the exchange to connect the user's telephone to an originating sender, which returned the user a dial tone. The sender then recorded the dialed digits and passed them to the originating marker, which selected an outgoing trunk and operated the various crossbar switch stages to connect the calling user to it. The originating marker then passed the trunk call completion requirements (type of pulsing, resistance of the trunk, etc.) and the called party's details to the sender and released. The sender then relayed this information to a terminating sender (which could be on either the same or a different exchange). This sender then used a terminating marker to connect the calling user, via the selected incoming trunk, to the called user, and caused the controlling relay set to send the ring signal to the called user's phone, and return ringing tone to the caller.

The crossbar switch itself was simple: exchange design moved all the logical decision-making to the common control elements, which were very reliable as relay sets. The design criteria specified only two hours of downtime for service every forty years, which was a large improvement over earlier electromechanical systems. The exchange design concept lent itself to incremental upgrades, as the control elements could be replaced separately from the call switching elements. The minimum size of a crossbar exchange was comparatively large, but in city areas with a large installed line capacity the whole exchange occupied less space than other exchange technologies of equivalent capacity. For this reason they were also typically the first switches to be replaced with digital systems, which were even smaller and more reliable.

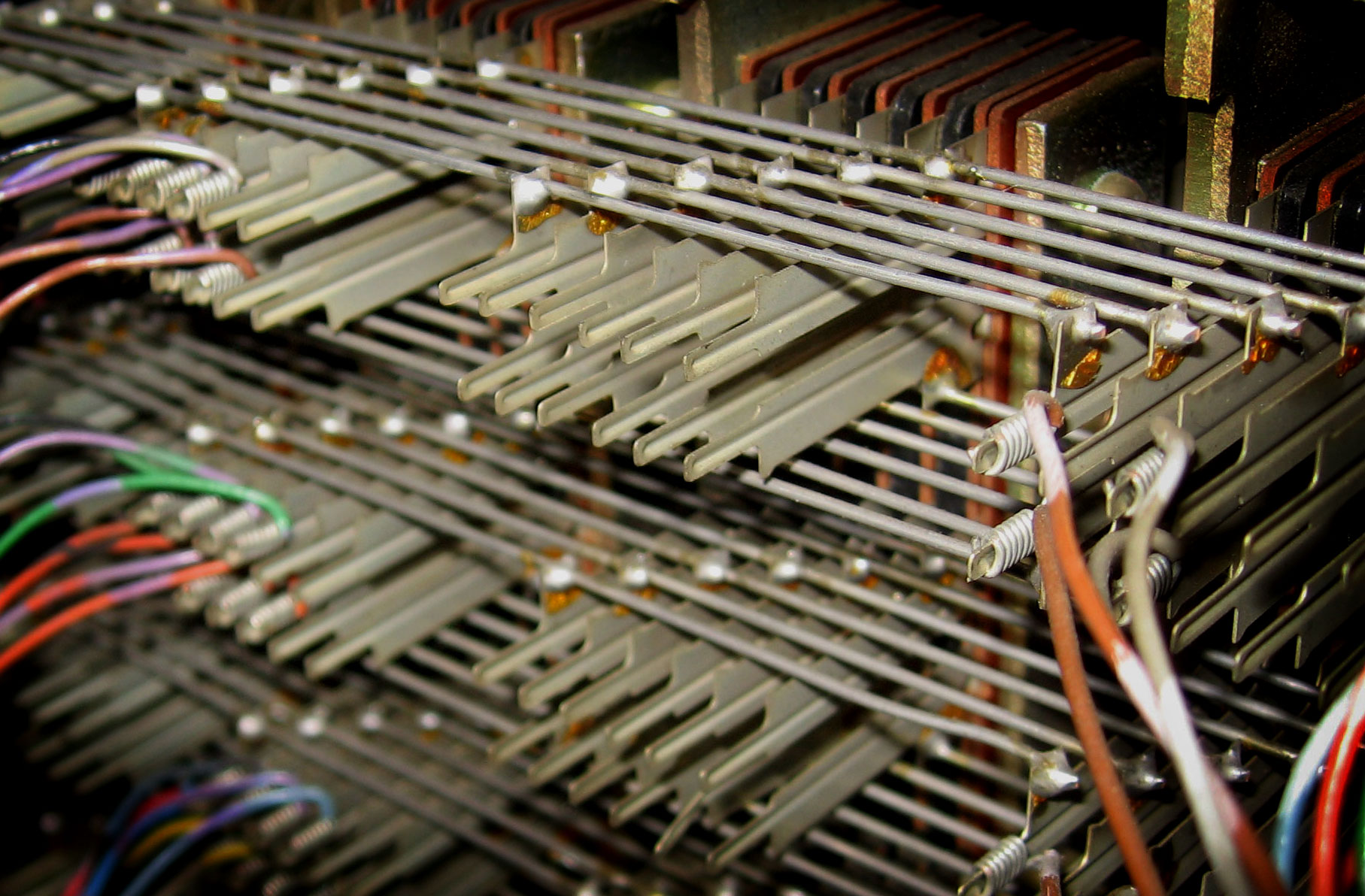
Bare-strip wiring of a 100-point six-wire Type B Bell System switch

Starting with the 1XB switch, the later and more common method was based on the link principle, and used the switches as crosspoints. Each moving contact was multipled to the other contacts on the same level by bare-strip wiring, often nicknamed banjo wiring. to a link on one of the inputs of a switch in the next stage. The switch could handle its portion of as many calls as it had levels or verticals. Thus an exchange with forty 10×10 switches in four stages could have one hundred conversations in progress. The link principle was more efficient, but required a complex control system to find idle links through the switching fabric.

This meant common control, as described above: all the digits were recorded, then passed to the common control equipment, the marker, to establish the call at all the separate switch stages simultaneously. A marker-controlled crossbar system had in the marker a highly vulnerable central control; this was invariably protected by having duplicate markers. The great advantage was that the control occupancy on the switches was of the order of one second or less, representing the operate and release lags of the X-then-Y armatures of the switches. The only downside of common control was the need to provide digit recorders enough to deal with the greatest forecast originating traffic level on the exchange.

The Plessey TXK1 or 5005 design used an intermediate form, in which a clear path was marked through the switching fabric by distributed logic, and then closed through all at once.

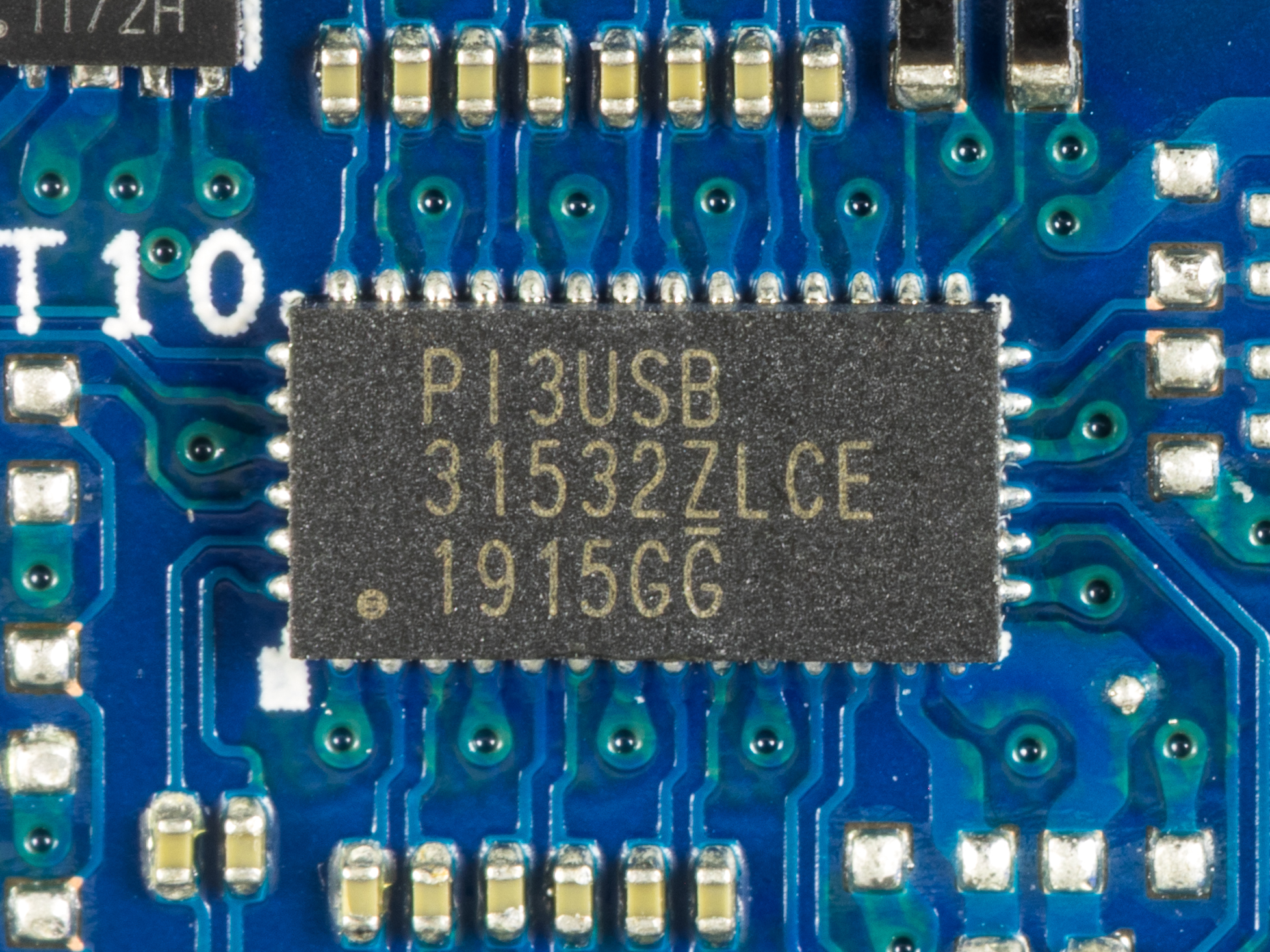
Crossbar switch Pericom PI3USB31532: Type-C USB 3.2 Gen 2/DP 2.1 (UHBR10) 6:4/4:6

Crossbar exchanges remain in revenue service only in a few telephone networks. Preserved installations are maintained in museums, such as the Museum of Communications in Seattle, Washington, and the Science Museum in London.

=== Semiconductor ===
Semiconductor implementations of crossbar switches typically consist of a set of input amplifiers or retimers connected to a series of interconnects within a semiconductor device. A similar set of interconnects are connected to output amplifiers or retimers. At each cross-point where the bars cross, a pass transistor is implemented which connects the bars. When the pass transistor is enabled, the input is connected to the output.

As computer technologies have improved, crossbar switches have found uses in systems such as the multistage interconnection networks that connect the various processing units in a uniform memory access parallel processor to the array of memory elements.

== See also ==
- Matrix mixer
- Nonblocking minimal spanning switch - describes how to combine crossbar switches into larger switches.
- RF switch matrix
