= SP-1 switch =

Telecommunications switch by Northern Electric

SP-1 (Stored Program 1) was the name of a computerized telephone exchange (a so-called switching office) manufactured by Northern Electric (later Northern Telecom and now Nortel Networks beginning in 1972) in Canada. It was introduced in 1971.

As indicated by the name "Stored Program", the SP-1 introduced computer control to the telephone switching market. (AT&T's #1ESS preceded the SP-1 by several years.)

A central computer controlled the operation of the switch. Switch behavior was determined by the operation of a computer program.

With its use of computer hardware and software control, the SP-1 marked an evolutionary step in telephony design. It was an intermediate form between the previous generation of electromechanical systems and the next generation of fully digital systems. Like the previous generation of systems, the SP-1 was an analog switch that used a special form of mechanical relay (Minibar crossbar switch) to provide the voice connections. The voice signal remained in the analog domain throughout the exchange, with the crossbar switches providing a metallic path to connect the end points of a call together. However the SP1 replaced the previous generation's complex relay-based controllers (markers) with a modern Harvard architecture electronic computer, with separate data and program memories. SSI DTL logic was used throughout. Two types of memory was used - ferrite sheet memory for the CPU and Piggyback Twistor memory for the storage of program and routing information. A number of variations on the base switch were available. A "two wire" version for local service, a four wire version for toll service. Two/four wire versions were also available as was a TOPS variant that was used to provide Operator services. The first four wire switch (four wire-tops, i.e., it provided toll switching and operator services) was placed in service in Thunder Bay circa 1972. The operator service consoles (CRTs) used an Intel 4004 processor.

The next generation of systems evolved from the SP1 design to replace the analog switch with a digital technology. SP-1 proved the feasibility of software-controlled systems for telephony. It set the stage for the introduction of fully digital systems with the development of the DMS (Digital Multiplex Systems) by Nortel in the 1970s. (Nortel's SL-1 (PBX) was Nortel's first fully digital switching system, and it was introduced in service in 1975.)

== See also ==
- DMS-100
- Electronic Switching System
- 1ESS switch
- TXE
- Stored Program Control exchange
- SP-1 Technical Bulletin
