= Digital Multiplex System =

Electronic telephone switch

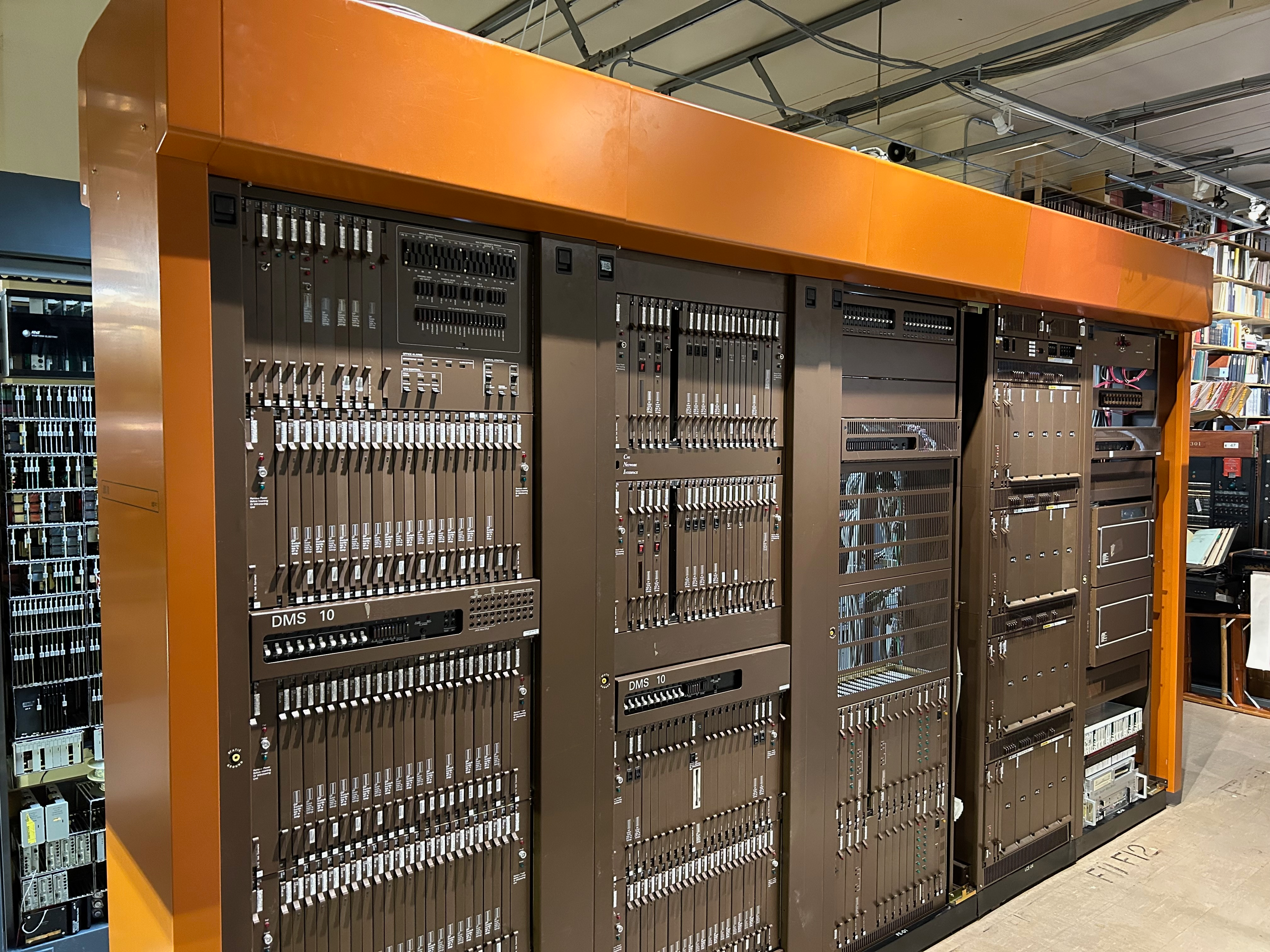
A DMS-10 at the Connections Museum in Seattle, WA.

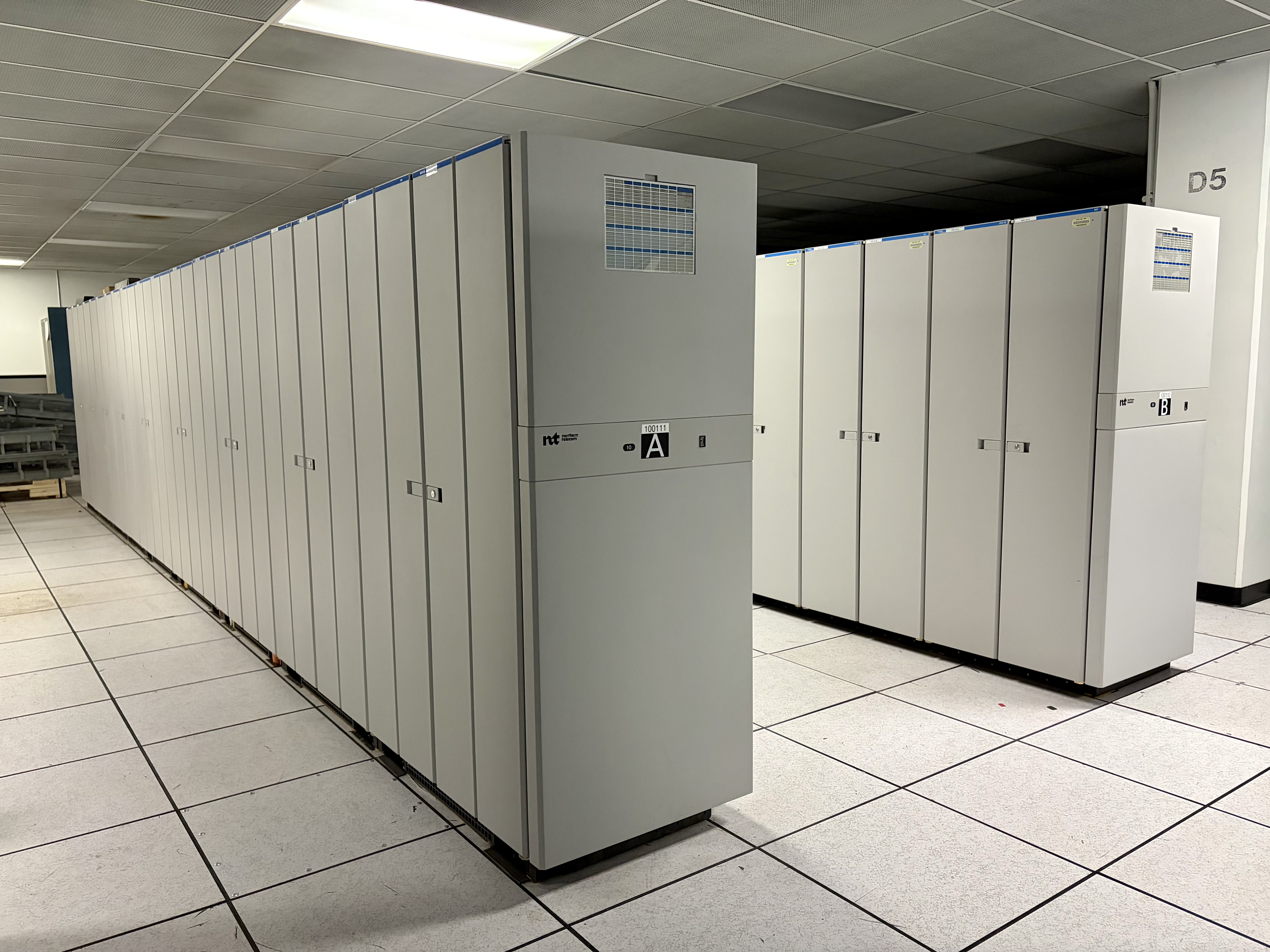
A DMS-250 switch, used for toll (long distance) and tandem telephone traffic in the United States.

Digital Multiplex System (DMS) is the name shared among several different telephony product lines from Nortel Networks for wireline and wireless operators. Among them are the DMS-1 (originally named the DMS-256) Rural/Urban digital loop carrier, the DMS-10 telephone switch, the DMS SuperNode family of telephone switches (DMS-100, DMS-200, DMS-250, DMS-300, DMS-500, DMS-GSP, DMS-MSC, DMS-MTX), and the S/DMS optical transmission system.

Exploratory development on the technology began at Northern Telecom's Bell Northern Research Labs in Ottawa, Ontario in 1971. The first Class 5 switch, the DMS-10, began service on 21 October 1977 in Fort White, Florida and the first toll switch (Class 4), the DMS-200, entered service in 1979 in Ottawa. The DMS-10 was the first commercially successful Class 5 digital switch in the North American market and had a profound impact on the industry. Of the numerous digital switching products introduced in the North American telephone market in the late 1970s, only the Nortel DMS family is still in production. GENBAND (now Ribbon Communications) acquired Nortel CVAS assets including the DMS line in 2011 and rolled it into its IP-based GENiUS platform.

Previously, new technology had entered the telecommunications industry slowly, with the telephone companies amortizing equipment over periods as long as forty years. AT&T was intending to delay the introduction of digital switching until the 1990s. The DMS, with its introduction of digital technology, changed the industry and became one of the antecedents that encouraged the growth of the Internet.

On October 16, 2006, Nortel received a special recognition award from Canada's Telecommunications Hall of Fame for its role in pioneering digital communications with the Digital Multiplex System.

The DMS name arose from a designation for a switching matrix design that was developed in the exploratory phase of the project. The Digital Multiplexed Switch was selected as the basic switching design for the project. The product was intended as a successor for Nortel's first electronic switch, the SP1, and was to be called the SP2. However the DMS acronym was mellifluous and was eventually (1975) adopted as the designation for the DMS-10 and DMS-100 family of products, with the "S" standing for "system" rather than "switch". It was then applied to the entire digital switching family as well as the DMS-1 family of Digital Transmission Concentrators.

DMS is favoured by many European cable operators as the switching platform for their voice networks. The DMS-10 is widely used by rural wireline providers. DMS-100 and 200 switches are widely deployed throughout the US and Canada by Regional Bell Operating Companies, Bell Canada and independent telephone companies as well as the US Military. The DMS-250 is the backbone of a number of carriers' long-distance networks. The DMS-300 is an international gateway switch, and the DMS-500 is commonly deployed by competitive local exchange carriers because it combines DMS-100 and 250 capabilities.

DMS switches run a proprietary multitasking operating system known as SOS. The user interface, called MAPCI, consists of a series of multi-level menus and is usually accessed from a connected VT100 compatible dumb terminal or terminal emulator. Each level or overlay performs different functions.

== See also ==
- List of telephone switches
