= Sorter =

Sorter may refer to:

- Sorter (logistics), a system that sorts products according to destination
- Card sorter, a machine to sort computer punched card
- Cash sorter machine, a machine used for sorting banknotes
- Coin sorter, a machine used for sorting coins
- Keirsey Temperament Sorter, a self-assessed personality questionnaire
- Sorting algorithm, an algorithm to put elements of a list into order

== See also ==
- Sort (disambiguation)
