= TXK =

TXK (Telephone eXchange Crossbar) was a range of Crossbar exchanges used by the British Post Office telephone network, subsequently BT, between 1964 and 1994. TXC was used as the designation at first, but this was later changed as TXC sounded too much like TXE the code used for later electronic exchanges. Prior to this the GPO had standardised on Strowger for automatic switching and had resisted the adoption of Crossbar, preferring to wait for its electronic switching research to bear fruit. The development of electronic systems however took longer than anticipated and the British equipment manufacturers, particularly Automatic Telephone & Electric (ATE), which later became part of the Plessey group feared that continuing to focus the bulk of their production on Strowger equipment would harm their export sales as Crossbar had already become popular throughout the world.

In response to this, ATE, and later Plessey, developed their own crossbar system, the 5005, and pushed for the GPO to adopt it as an interim measure. Normally the GPO preferred to develop systems in co-operation with the manufacturing companies, from whom they could then purchase competitively rather than allowing one manufacturer to sell it a proprietary system. The situation however was becoming critical, waiting lists for telephone service in the UK were growing embarrassingly long and the manufacturers were becoming more and more reluctant to supply Strowger in the quantities needed by the GPO. Eventually the GPO relented and decided to accept Crossbar equipment into its network.

== TXK1 ==
This code was given to Plessey's 5005A switch, which was used for local exchanges in non-director areas or group switching centres / sector switching centres (tandem exchanges). The 5005A was a two wire version of the 5005, meaning the transmit and receive speech was routed through the switch over one pair of wires. The first one was installed at Broughton, Preston, in 1964 as a field trial replacing Broughton's manual exchange. The village was chosen due to its relative proximity to the Plessey factory and research centre at Edge Lane, Liverpool.

Mainstream installation of TXK1s commenced in 1968, and many were installed throughout the UK until the late 1970s when the more modern TXE4 electronic system became available. TXK1 remained in use in the BT network until March 1994, when the last one at Droitwich, Worcestershire was replaced with a digital exchange.

The Plessey 5005 was made up of routers and distributors. A distributor performed subscriber concentration and could serve up to 500 lines. A router made up the core of the exchange for switching traffic between distributors or between a distributor and an external junction/trunk. The exchange at Broughton was initially dimensioned to serve 2,000 lines and therefore had four distributors and one router. A 5005 could serve up to 100,000 lines, but no inland exchanges of this size were used in the UK.

TXK was also manufactured by GEC Telecommunications of Coventry based on the Plessey 5005 design. GEC provided Sector Switching Centres in the London director area at Ilford, Wood Green, Colindale, Ealing, Kingston, Croydon and Eltham. These exchanges were controlled by the GEC designed Mk 1c processor.

== TXK2 ==
Plessey 5005T (TXK2) at Paddington, Sydney, Australia

This code was used for Plessey 5005T exchanges which was a 4 wire version of the 5005 (separate pair for transmit & receive). In the UK TXK2s were only used as an international gateway, initially at Wood Street (WS) exchange in the City of London. This switch had been previously sold by Plessey to the Overseas Telecommunications Commission Australia (OTC) for use as an international gateway at Sydney. The British Post Office was planning with Plessey Ltd for a switch at Wood Street but with advanced facilities. Plessey was in difficulty with this development and could not make Wood Street work on time and in-budget. As OTC had replaced their 5005T with an Ericsson switch, so the 5005T was air-freighted back to the UK in desperation to be put into service at Wood Street. The 5005T was identical to the 5005A except for the 4 wire switching, the lack of subscriber line circuits and concentration stage (i.e. no distributors).

The switch which Plessey struggled with was also 4-wire but controlled by manual boards – the tallest boards ever made at the Beeston factory. The cords, of course, did not carry the speech. They controlled the routing from end to end via the crossbar 4-wire switches. The operators selected the route and the crossbar used mass-marking to find a path. One of the problems was the design of the high capacity relay. It was developed from the 3000 type, but with wire-wrap connections and more springs. The lifting comb proved to be difficult to make, and much Araldite was used to rectify the faults.

Plessey further supplied the British Post Office with TXK2 switches at DeHavilland ISC (Burnt Oak) and Mondial ISC in Central London. The first switch was similar technically to the Wood St Relief Unit, but the latter was larger and came with the developments of Codesender Router and Line Terminations for CCITT R2 (MF(C) with E&M line signalling).

== TXK3 ==
TXK3 was the code allocated to STC's BXB 1100, a 2 wire version of the French Pentaconta system. It was used by the GPO for local exchanges in director areas (London, Manchester, Birmingham, Liverpool, Edinburgh and Glasgow) and for some non-director exchanges in Northern Ireland. The first one opened at Edinburgh Liberton in 1971.

== TXK4 ==
This code was used for STC's BXB1121 which was a four-wire version of the French Pentaconta system, used by the British Post Office for main trunk exchanges. They were all replaced in the 1980s by System X.

== TXK5 & 6 ==
These codes were allocated to two Ericsson Crossbar systems used as international gateways in London. TXK5 was LM Ericsson ARM200 and TXK6 was the same manufacturer's AKE13 system.
