= GPO telephones =

British General Post Office department for telephones and communication

The General Post Office (GPO) of the United Kingdom carried the sole responsibility for providing telecommunication services across the country with the exception of Hull. The GPO issued a range of telephone instruments to telephone service subscribers that were matched in function and performance to its telephone exchanges.

== General history ==
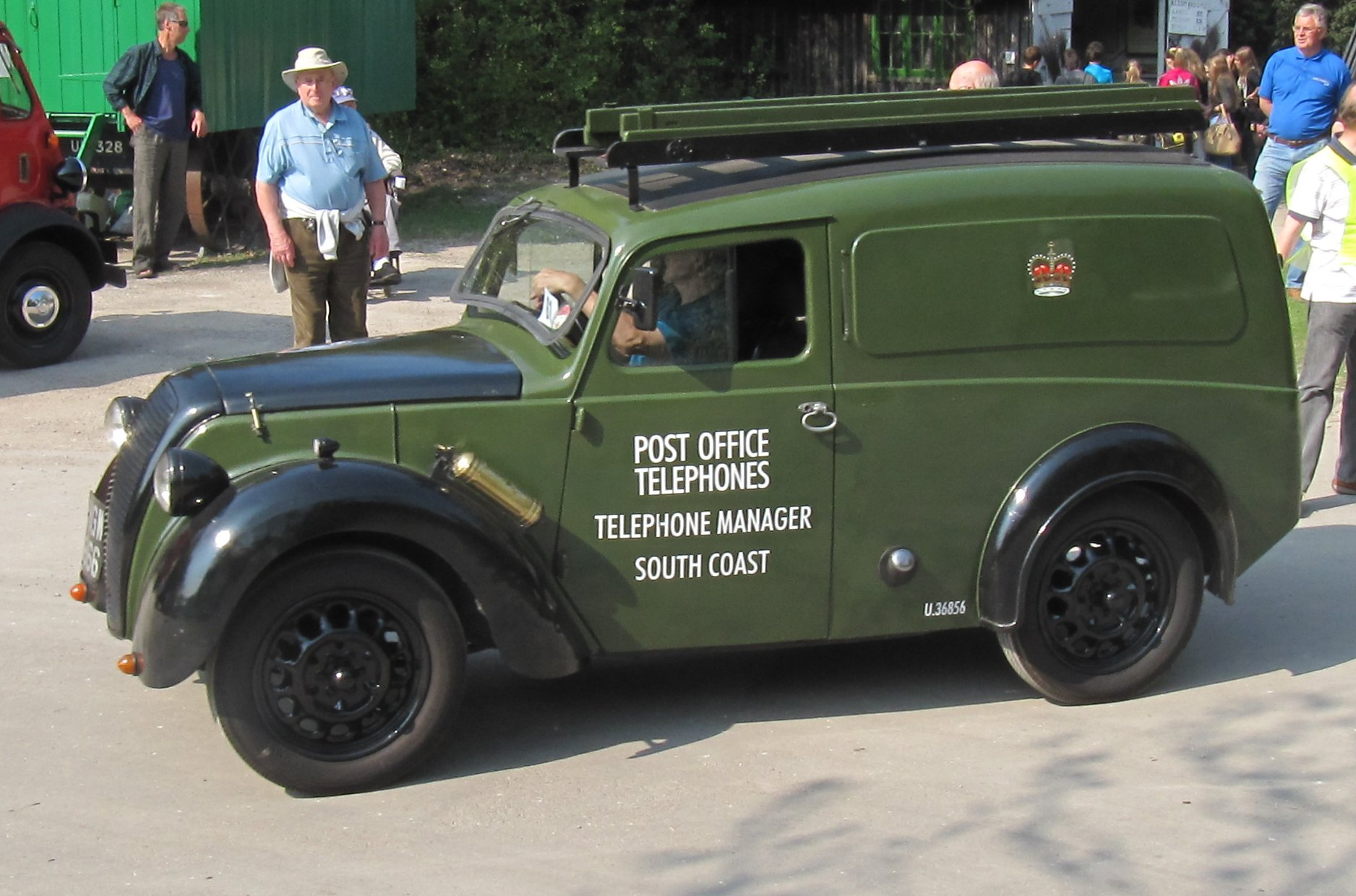
A vintage Post Office Telephones van, dating from 1946.

Until October 1969, the GPO had a monopoly on the provision of all telephone lines and telephones within the UK, other than in Kingston upon Hull, which for historical reasons was unique in maintaining its own municipal telephone service. From 1 October 1969, the Post Office Corporation replaced the General Post Office with ownership of the former GPO business. Customers of the PO (known internally as "subs", short for 'subscribers') did not own their telephones. They were instead rented from the GPO, together with the house wiring and the wiring connecting the house to the local network at a connection point known as a DP (distribution point), which was generally located at the top of a nearby telegraph pole.

During the early days of telephones, in the UK, a variety of instruments were produced, in low volume, often combining new and emerging technologies with the traditional skills of the wood joiner and cabinetmaker. They were simply known as Type 1, 2, 3 etc. These were often used on simple, internal links, sometimes taking the place of the 'speaking tube' in large houses. These instruments had no dials, and signalling consisted of a hand-cranked magneto generator. Often the bell at the other end would just be 'tinkled' by simply rattling the switch hooks up and down.←From these developed the first, serious, GPO instruments, the 100 series. This comprised the Type 121, a wall phone, and the Type 150, a desk phone.

== Types 121 and 150 ==
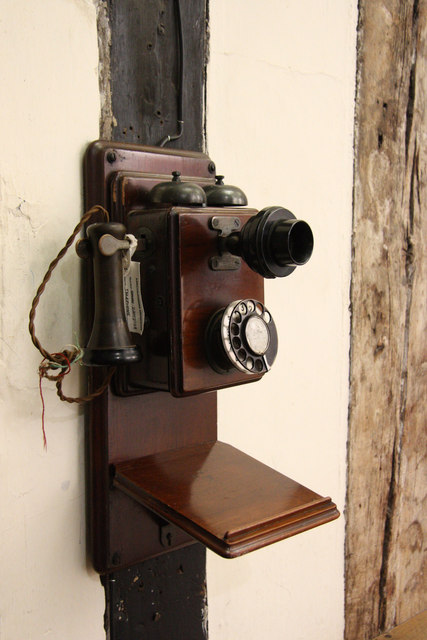
Wall-mounted Type 121 GPO telephone and writing desk.

Both were based around the same handmade, wooden case, containing the telephone circuit and bell. The Type 121 had the transmitter mouthpiece screwed onto the front of the box and the switch hook, holding the receiver, protruding from the left hand side. Below the mouthpiece was a dial-mount, which either contained a dial (F or L - Figures only or with Letters - from about 1926) or a blanking plate (CB). This made it a true, one-piece telephone which was available either 'stand alone', mounted on a handsome, wooden, back-board, with integral writing desk or, as a Tele. 123, combined with the original, Button A & B coin-box.

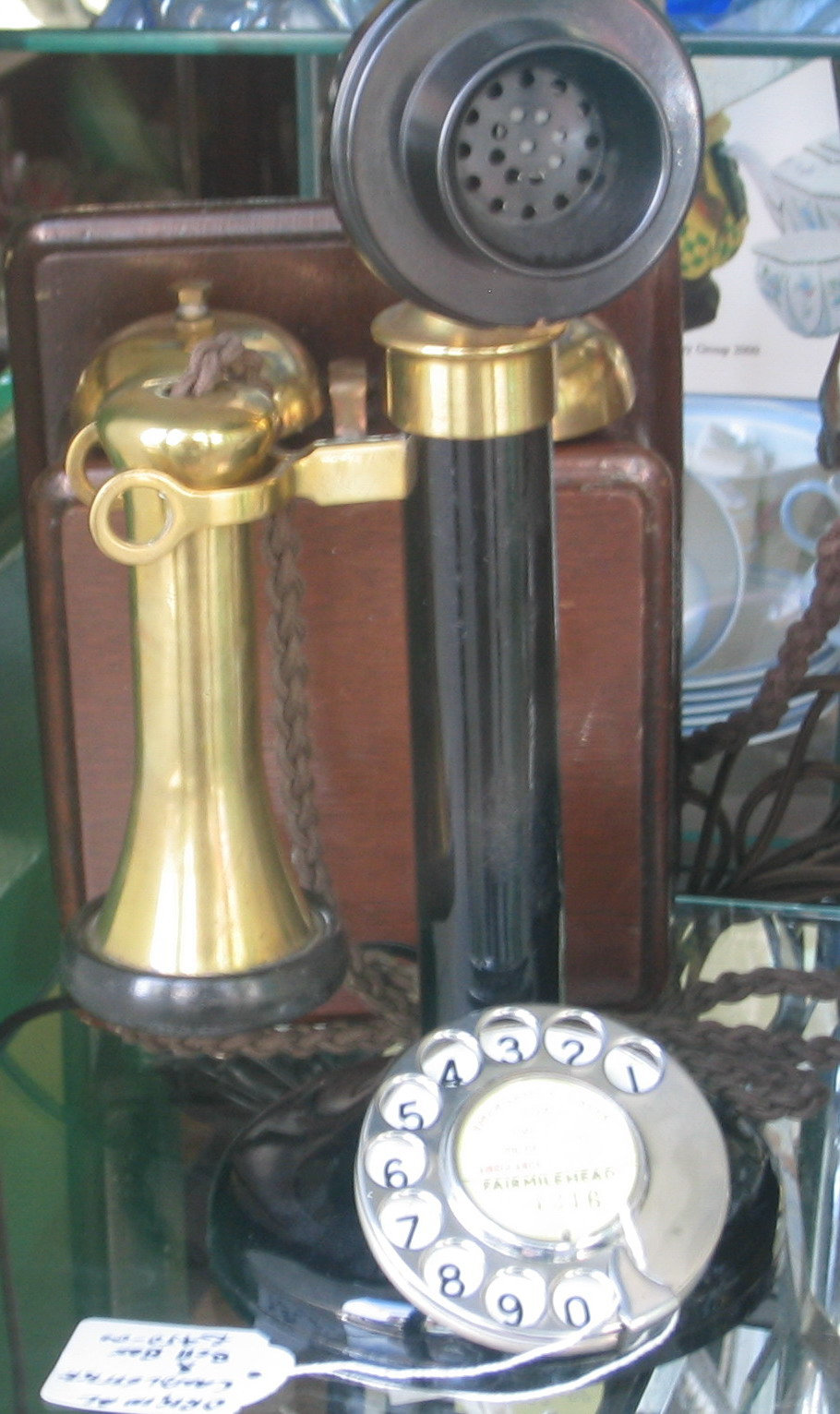
Type 150L 'Candlestick' telephone, c. 1929.

The Type 150 'candlestick' two-piece telephone is now a collectible item. The bell receiver was originally coated in a black vulcanised rubber (Vulcanite) and the remaining brass work had a black oxide finish (In the photo the original black finish has been stripped to reveal the brass; the dial is also later, the original number 10 dial would also have been finished in black oxide on copper.) The L denotes an alphanumeric (rather than number only) dial plate. The dial uses a slipping cam Rotary dial - distinct from the CB (central battery) version - which was without any dial and relied entirely upon connection via the operator. The transmitter (microphone) was of a very poor, carbon granule construction, which absorbed moisture and required regular replacement. However, the low cost ensured that this transmitter would continue to be used for many years to come. In contrast, the twin coil and diaphragm receiver was of very good quality, indeed.

The Type 150, like its successor the Type 162, was actually only the 'front end' of the telephone. Containing only the transmitter, receiver and switch hook assembly; the entire electrical telephone circuitry was contained within an accompanying magneto bell set. This was initially the wooden cased version shown or the later, compact, Bakelite, Bell set 25.

== Type 162 & 232 ==
The 162 was originally launched in 1929 as the last of the 100 series. Once its potential was realised it was quickly promoted to a Type number of its own, becoming in 1934 (with some internal modifications) the 232 and staying in production until 1957.

The Tele. 162 Handset Micro Telephone, was the first UK phone to incorporate the transmitter and receiver into a single unit, 'The Handset', which had not been used on telephones in the UK since the very early metal and wood cased models, and the BPO preference for a separate transmitter and Bell receiver, as on the Tele. 150 and Tele. 121.

It was designed as a very lightweight domestic phone, which could be carried around whilst in use, by hooking the fingers under the switch-hook cradle. For this purpose it could be ordered with an extra long instrument cord at additional cost. It was even with a blanking plate instead of the dial. Like the Tele. 150, it required a Bellset 25 to complete its electrical circuitry and to provide bells. This could be either screwed directly under the telephone or mounted separately in another location.

The Tele. 232 came out of the box fitted with a base plate containing a drawer, holding a personal directory card. The telephone could then be screwed directly onto the matching Bell set 26, making a true, but very heavy, telephone set, or screwed down onto the desk of a CCB (coin collecting box), in a Public Telephone Kiosk. In this form it was fitted with a modified dial, a more durable handset cord, and was re-numbered as the Tele. 242. There was one other variant. With modified internals and designed purely to be used in combination with a Bellset 39a or 44, this was the Tele. 248 in the guise of the Extension Plans 5 & 7. This type of telephone is often featured in British made period television dramas. Curiously, the telephone often rings despite not being fitted with any bell unit.

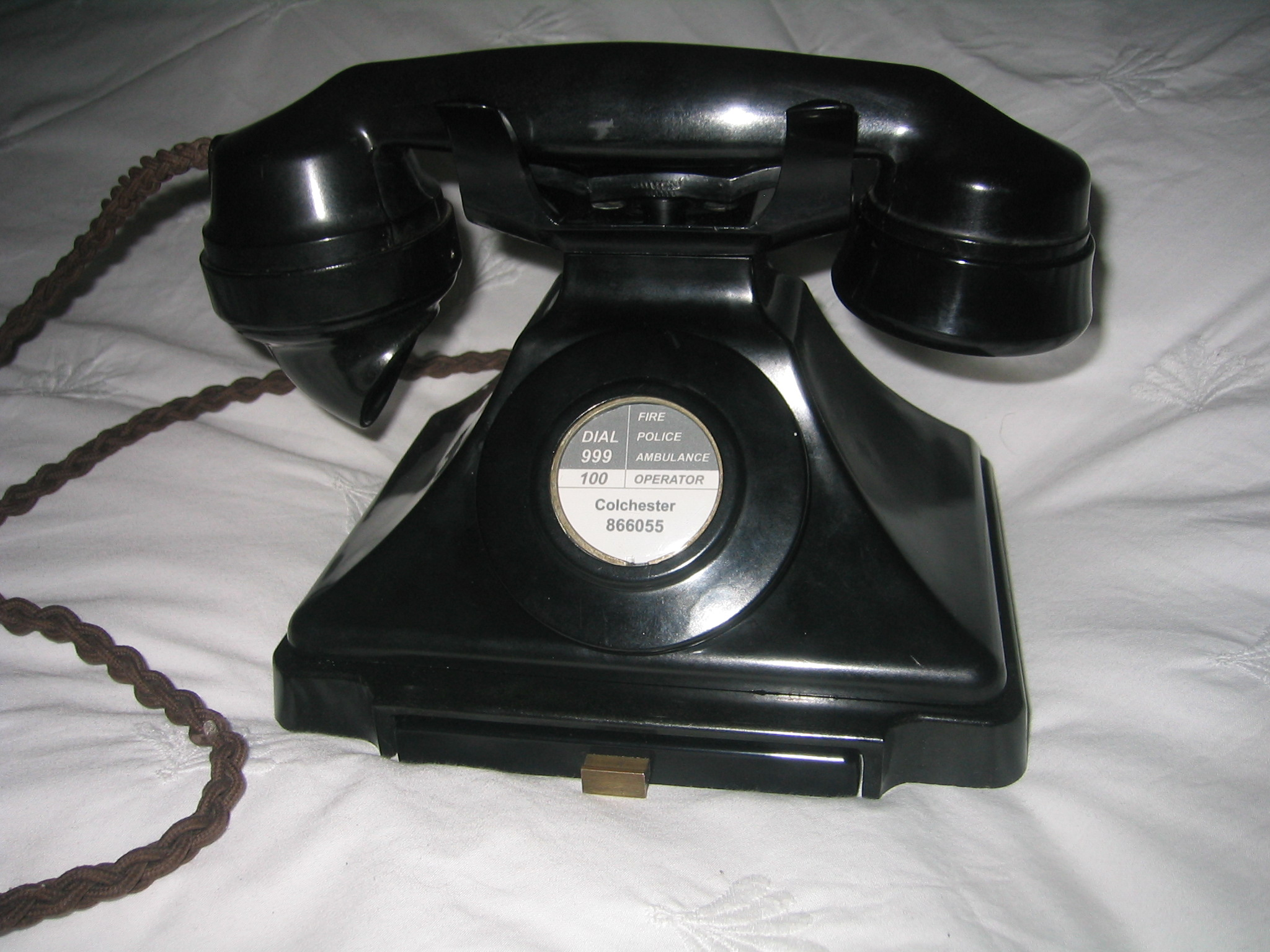
GPO Telephone 232CB, used on manual exchanges

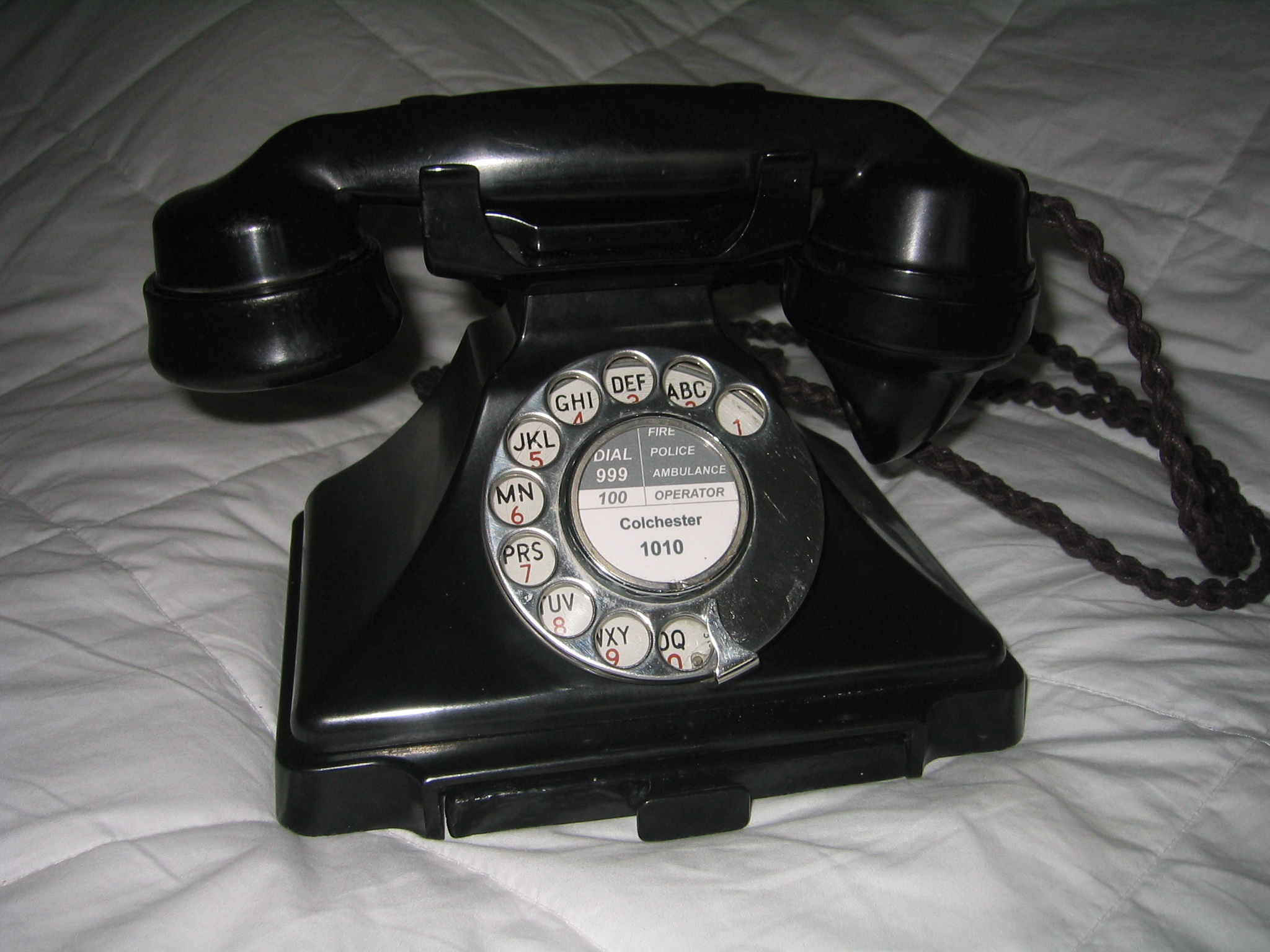
GPO Telephone 232L shown with a dial but without any bells

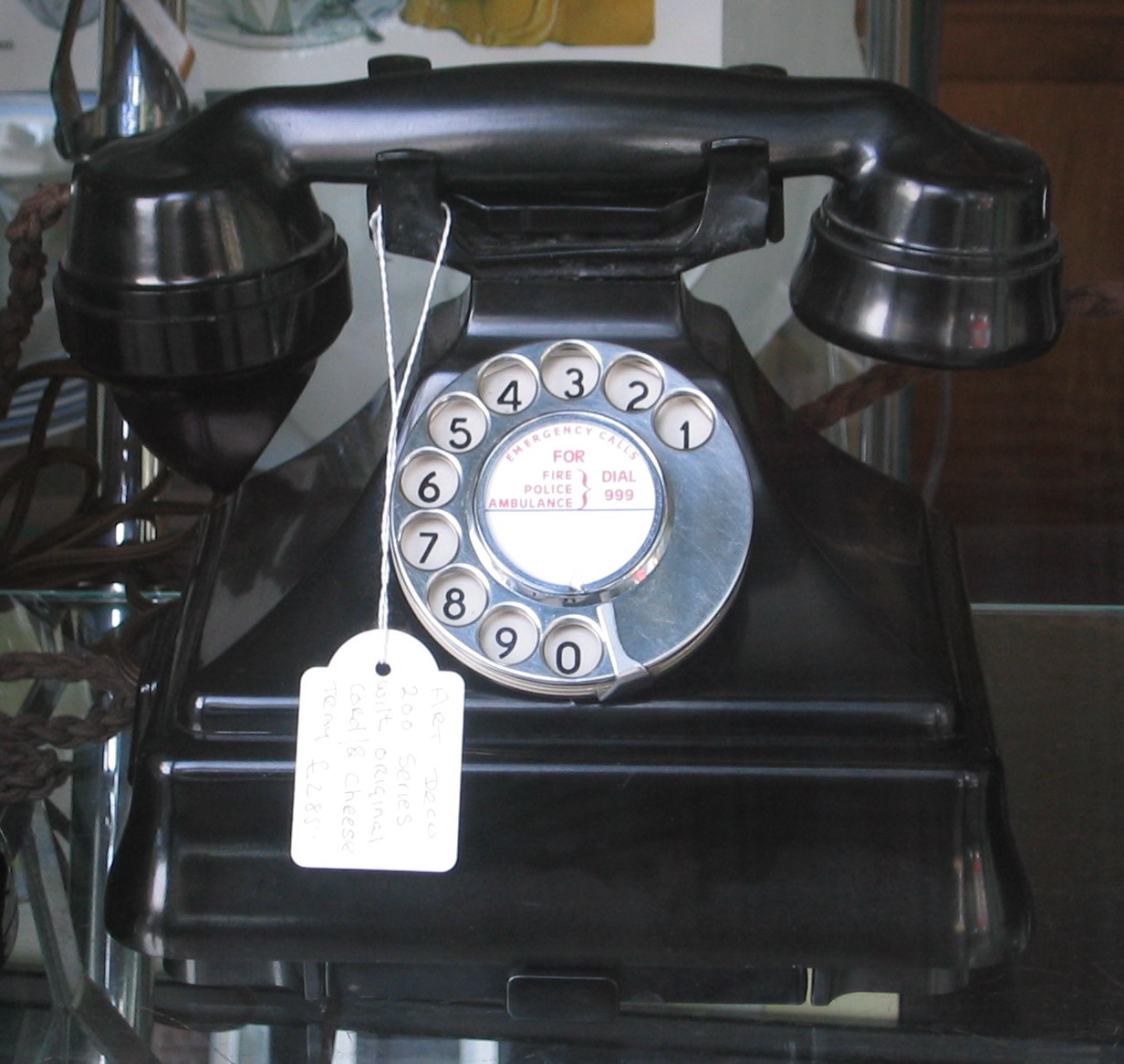
GPO Telephone 232F attached on top of a bell set 26

== Plan 5 and Plan 7 ==
This was the GPO's first attempt at a compact, supervised extension plan, for small businesses. The Plan 5 had 2 extensions plus the control station, the Plan 7 had only 1.These instruments were manufactured for the BPO by GEC.

The main operator control units, of these plans, appeared similar to a 232 plus Bellset 26 combo but was now a Tele. 248 plus Bellset 39a (early versions) or 44 (later). These Bellsets 39a and 44 were Bellsets in name only, as they contained no bell. What they did contain was a maze of spring contact sets, mainly activated by a cam at the pivot of the slide switch, which was a horizontal, quadrant mounted, 4 position slider, positioned via a recess in the front of the Bellset case, and was flanked by either 1 or 2 press buttons, for buzzing the extension(s). The main instrument required a separate, remote mounted bell, for signalling of incoming exchange calls.

The main instrument could make and answer exchange calls, talk to and transfer calls to the extension(s). The extensions could call and talk to each other and the main instrument, but could only make external calls if a request to the "operator" at the main instrument, for the exchange line to be switched to the extension was honoured.

Power for intercommunication signalling and speech circuits between the main instrument and the extension, when not on an exchange call, was provided by dry cell batteries at the main instrument.

The early extension instruments were also 200 Type telephones, mounted on a Bellset 39a or 44; but these were modified to remove the switching mechanism and contained an integral bell for exchange line signalling when the exchange was switched through to the extension and a buzzer for intercommunication signalling from the main.

Later extension instruments were: for extension 1 the Tele. 321 or 328 and for extension 2 the Tele. 326 or 327.

When this system was eventually revisited and brought up to date, with the 700 series Plans 105 and 107, the equivalent control unit was dubbed 'The Planset'.

== Type 332 ==
The 300 series equipment was introduced in 1937. The Tele. 332 ASTIC, Handset Micro Telephone was the standard telephone instrument issued by the GPO from 1937 until 1959, although 242Ls continued to be supplied for pay-on-answer kiosks. Essentially it was a redesign of the 232/bellset 26 combo. The term ASTIC indicates the use of an anti-sidetone induction coil, to permit only a small, controlled amount of speech signal back to the talker's ear to provide necessary sidetone for a natural communication experience. It continued in production until the mid-1960s. This was usually only available in black although ivory, red and, the especially rare, green were also produced. Although 332 is the generic for this model, by dint of superior numbers, there were four other models in the range. The glossy, sharp styled 332 gestated from the much poorer quality 330. Though similar, the quality and finish of the 330s moulding was poor, by comparison. Then there were the button phones. A 332 with the facility for one button is a 312, two buttons a 328 and three buttons a 314. For this reason, in the photos below the instrument on the left is, strictly speaking, a 314 and the one on the right a 312, despite the fact that their full potential is not being utilised. The Tele. 332L shown on the left is a bedside extension from an Extension Plan 1A. BELL ON – BELL OFF push buttons were added, forward of the switchook cradle. The centre button position is filled with a blanking stud and only a 2 way label is installed. The instrument on the right is a Tele. 312, but has its single button hole fitted with a blanking stud. The label screws are sitting redundant in their holes.

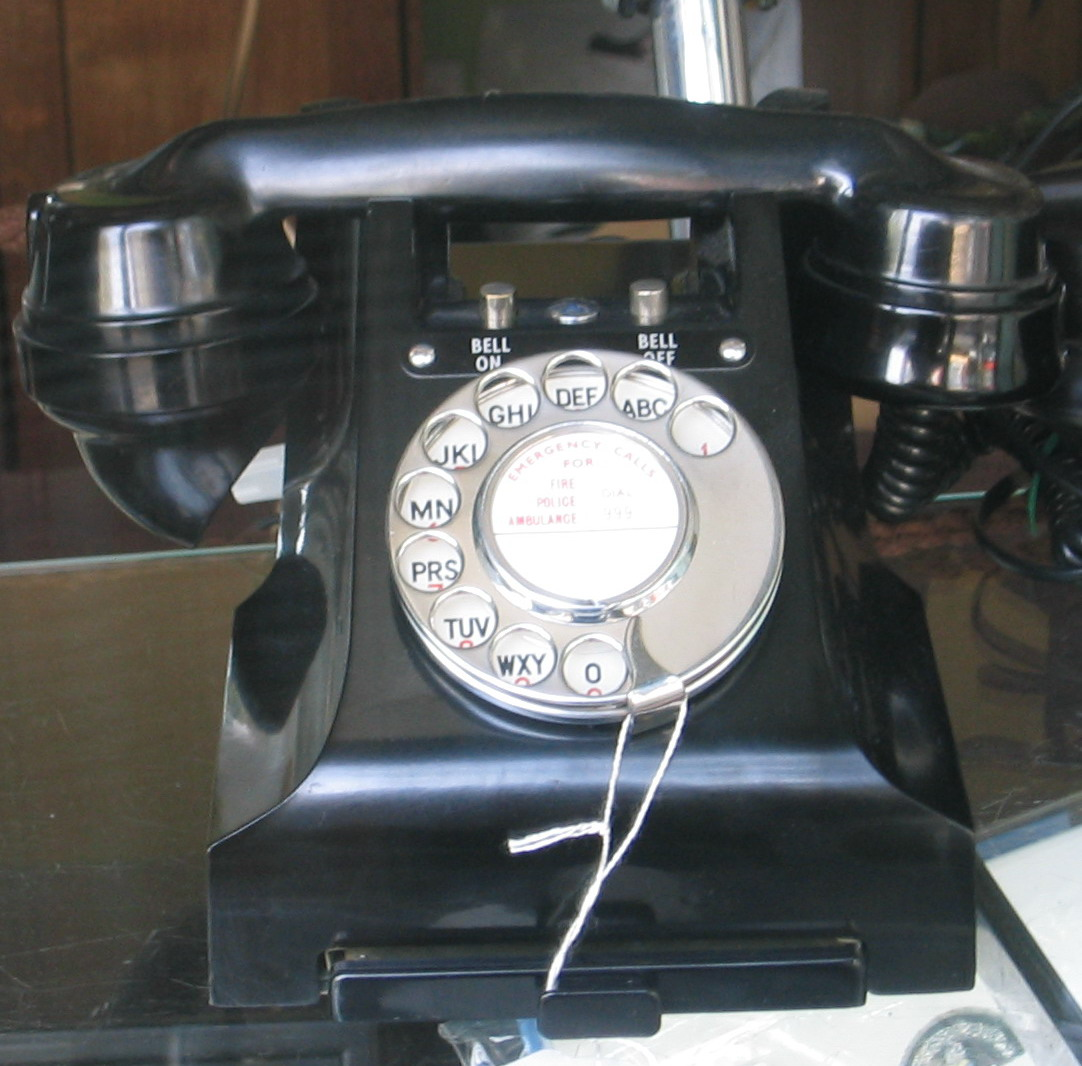
332 Telephone, Plan 1A extension

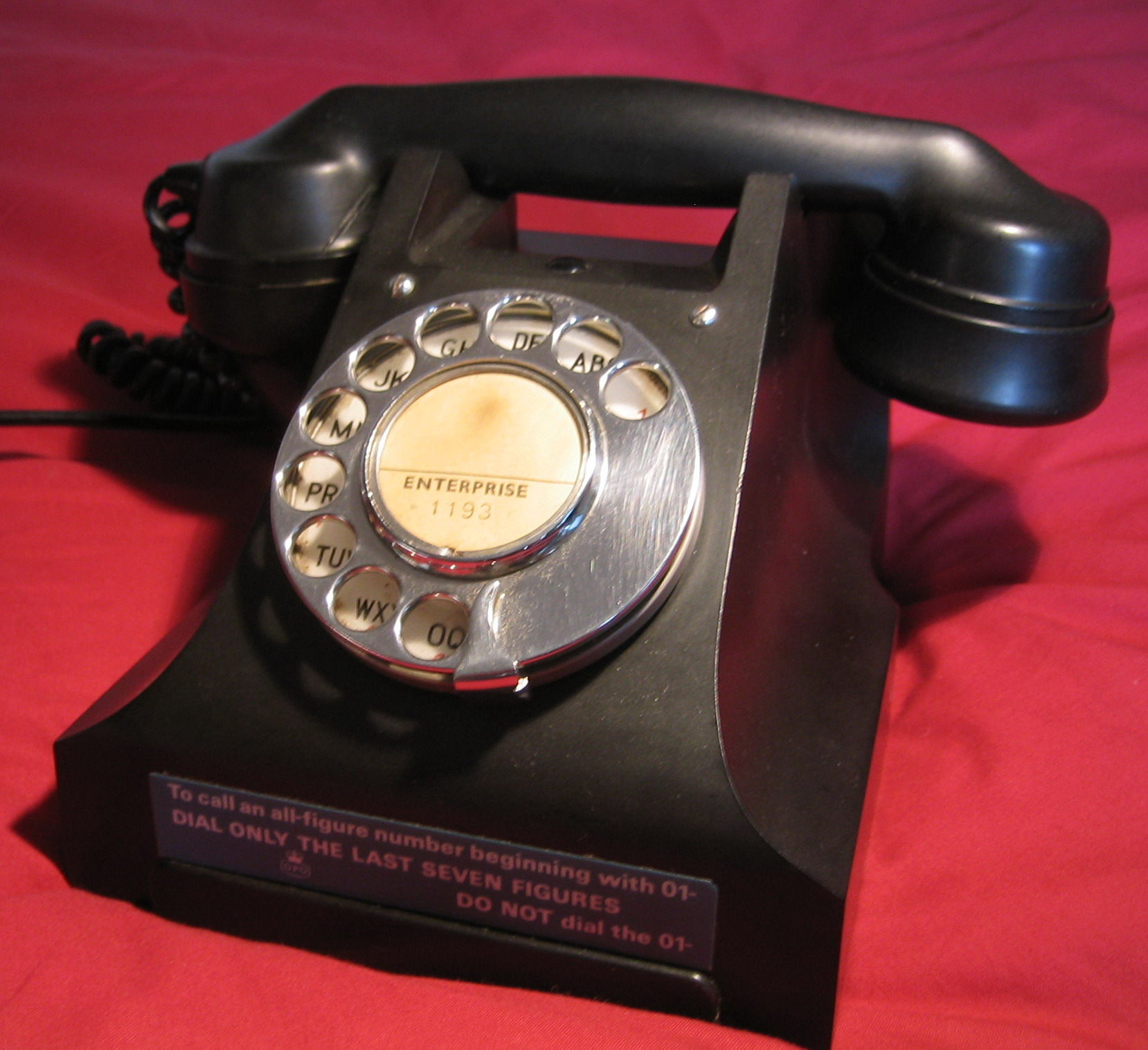
332 Telephone from the Director ENTerprise exchange which was in New Southgate, London. This telephone was manufactured in 1946 and factory refurbished in 1963 at the GPO Factory, Cwmcarn, Wales shown by F.W.R. on the base. A label attached indicates that the exchange had just converted to all figure dialling as opposed the letters and numbers as indicated by the dial label.

== House Exchange System ==
The 300 series was much more than just the Tele. 332. There was a whole range of similarly designed products. Fieldsets (Tappers), Headsets, Pendant Telephones, Wall Phones and the House Exchange System. Many private telephone companies had sprung up in the UK. As these were banned by law from connecting to external lines, they contented themselves with producing systems for automatically dialling between company offices, within the same building or, via private wires, rented from the GPO, virtually anywhere. The GPO could only do this via PMBXs (manual switchboards), ranging from the two to five line cordless boards, via the 25 and 50 line plug and cord boards to the mighty PMBX 1A, which, with its modular construction, could be any size a large company might require. The GPO regarded the private telephone companies as a thorn in their flesh and a great loss of potential income. They decided to tap into this lucrative market. Initially, they produced a system virtually identical to the competition and called it the House Telephone System. This appeared, from the rear, like a Tele. 332 but the front sloped down and was covered in two rows of buttons, by which a few other, similar, extensions could be called. Like the competition, this system was entirely internal and could not connect to the PSTN (Public Service Telephone Network). Unlike the competition, however, the number of extensions which could be incorporated was strictly limited. The GPO tried again.

The 300 series House Exchange System, now known as the HES1, was a combination of the Tele. 332L and the House Telephone System. From both the front and rear elevations the instrument appeared as a normal 332L. From the side, however, it was a different story. The snout of the instrument had been stretched forwards a full 8 inches in order to mount two rows of call buttons along with their plastic covered labels forward of the switchooks. All stations could make and take external calls, call any other station and also transfer calls between them. For the first time, small companies did not need to employ a telephonist – a big selling point. The main downside was that the central branch exchange unit was mains powered and used 50 Hz AC relays to route the calls. It had to be found a place out of the way as it was extremely noisy, the noise level increasing as calls were connected and relays energised.

== Bell Sets 25, 26, 31, 56, 59 ==
These were bell sets that could be used, either stand alone or attached to the base of a 232 type telephone or similar, to provide a complete telephone instrument, as Tele. 150s and Tele. 232s did not themselves have an integral telephone circuit or bell. For this reason, although mostly black, they were available in the full range of colours to complement a coloured instrument. All these bellsets appeared identical externally, with a contoured, moulded cover which looked stylish alone, but would dock firmly underneath a 232. They were all based upon the same baseplate but differed in the type of bell and whether this was alone or accompanied by a capacitor, and / or an induction coil and any other telephone circuit components and wiring.

== Bell Sets 64/67 ==
Electrically identical to Bellsets 26/56 but with an all-weather case and externally mounted bell gongs, for use where much more volume was required.

== Type 706 ==
The 700 series was the GPO's response to public demand, fuelled by American television shows, for a modern design with a helical, anti-tangle handset cord. The Telephone No. 706 was a revelation when it was first released in 1959. Again, still also available in CB (no dial) form, it was a robust design which is still in use today in the UK, suitably modified for use with the New Plan BT sockets. It was available in two-tone green, two-tone grey, topaz yellow, concorde blue, lacquer red, black and ivory.

The 706 was manufactured to a GPO design, by several manufacturers. There were two basic designs: one with a modern printed circuit and another with a wiring loom. Other variations included: metal or plastic baseplates and the presence or absence of a metal carrying handle.

The very first 706s had a metal dial similar to the 200 and 300 series phones. Later phones had a plastic dial. In both versions, letters and numbers surrounded the dial. 706s are usually marked 706L, which indicates that they have a lettered dial. The 706F with a figure only dial, the same as on the 746, and a plain ring around the dial with no letters or numbers was introduced in 1969.

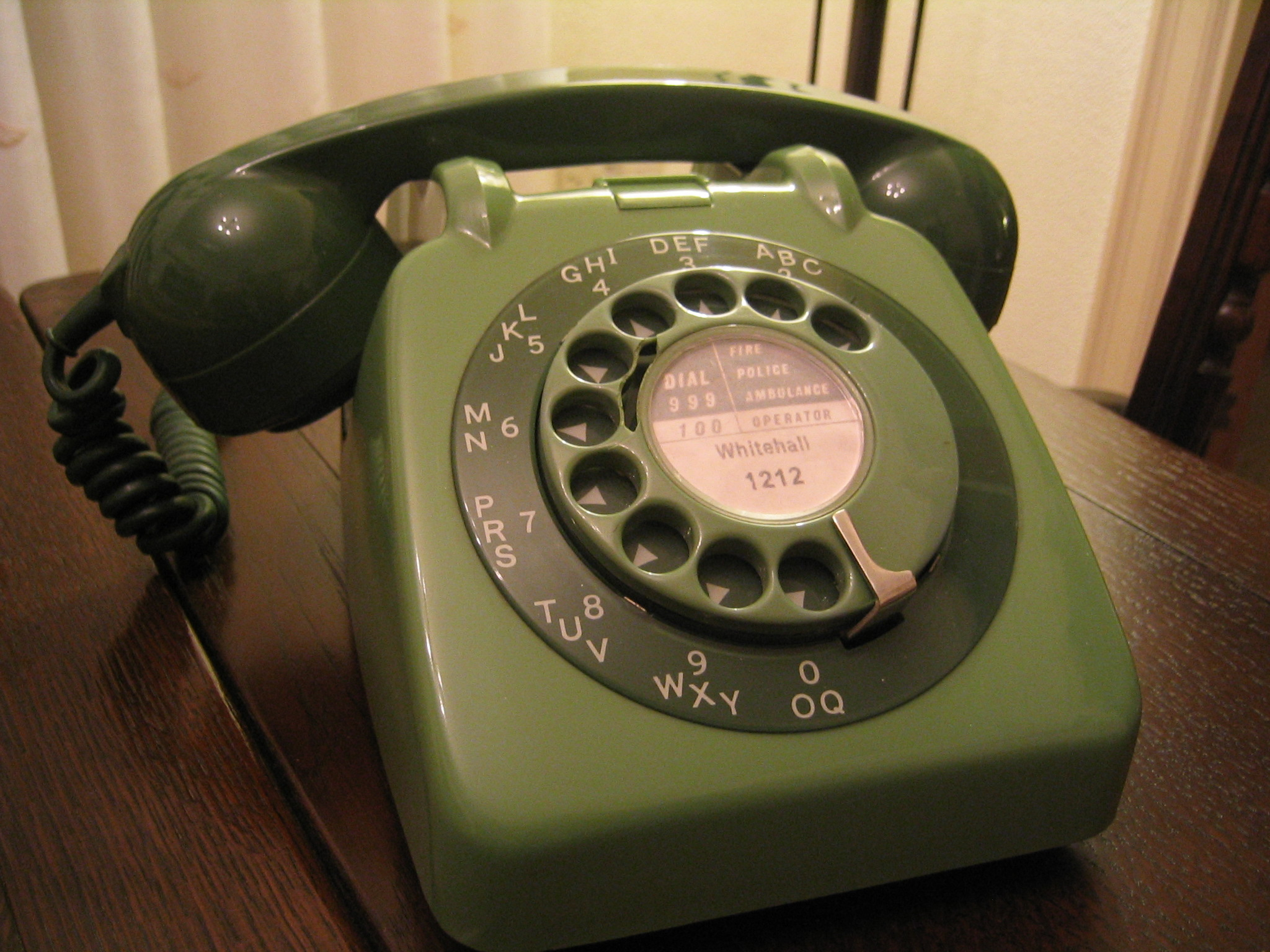
706 Two Tone Green Telephone manufactured 1963. This sample, unfortunately, has a cracked dial, but is an early version as later dials were clear

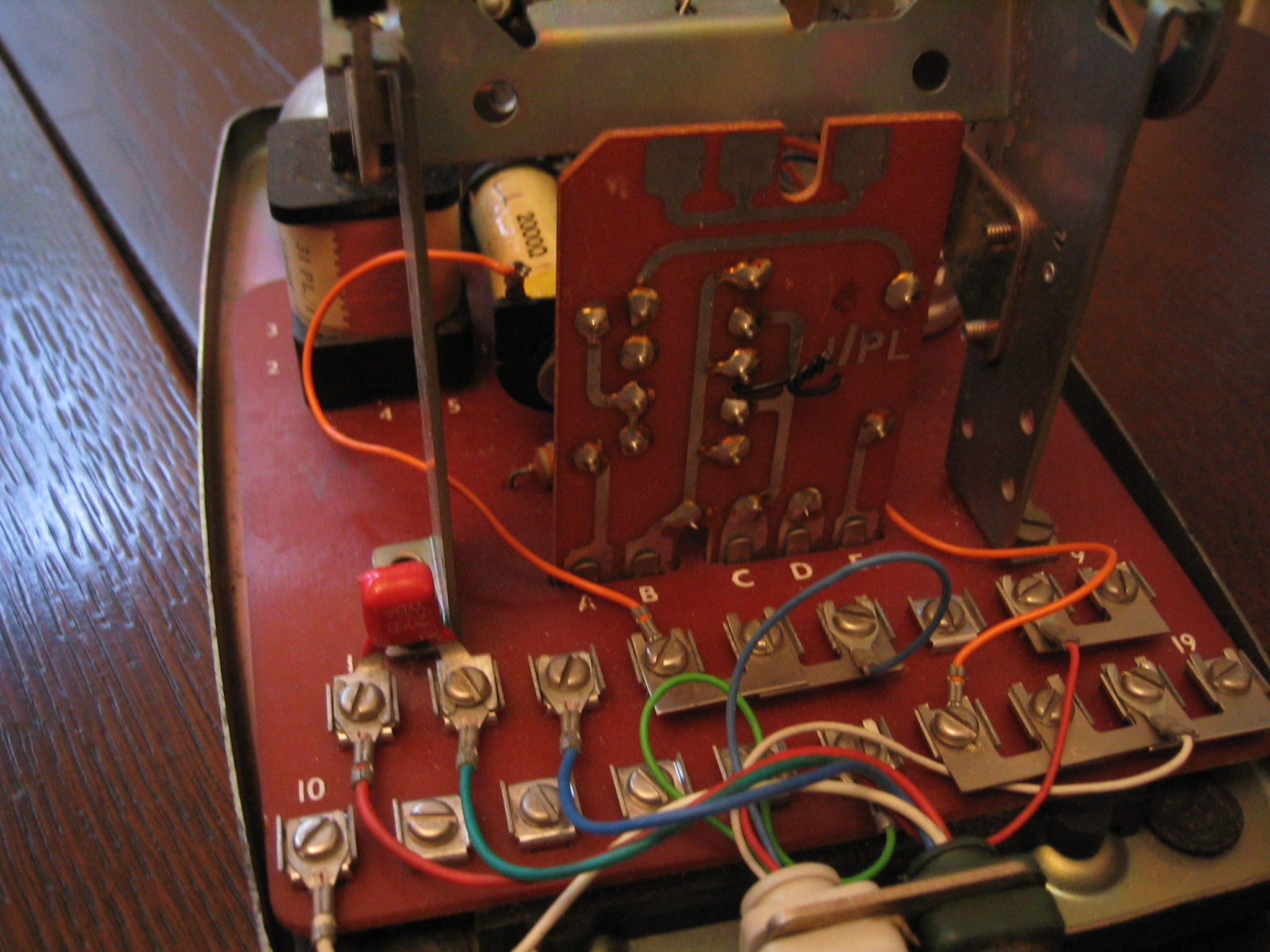
706 Telephone inside showing the reversible regulator mounted vertically and shown in circuit

A feature of the 706 was a regulator that could be used or not. The idea was, that if the subscriber was close to the exchange, the regulator would reduce the sensitivity, as it had been found that this telephone was too sensitive close to the exchange and also had a propensity for picking up radio broadcasts, from strong stations, mainly taxis. The purpose of the regulator was to vary the amount of AC speech current flowing through the transmitter and receiver, to prevent it being considered too loud by subscribers on short lines. The regulator consisted of a network of rectifiers, diodes, resistors and two thermistors.

The regulator could be removed from circuit, for customers not close to the exchange. This was achieved by turning it upside down, which substituted a shorting link instead of the components.

In practice the unit was normally left in circuit. The downside of this plugin module was that if the telephone was dropped or mishandled the regulator board would become loose and fall out and cause the telephone to stop working until it was replaced by a technician. Compare this with the inside of a 746 where the regulator was integrated into the main circuit board.

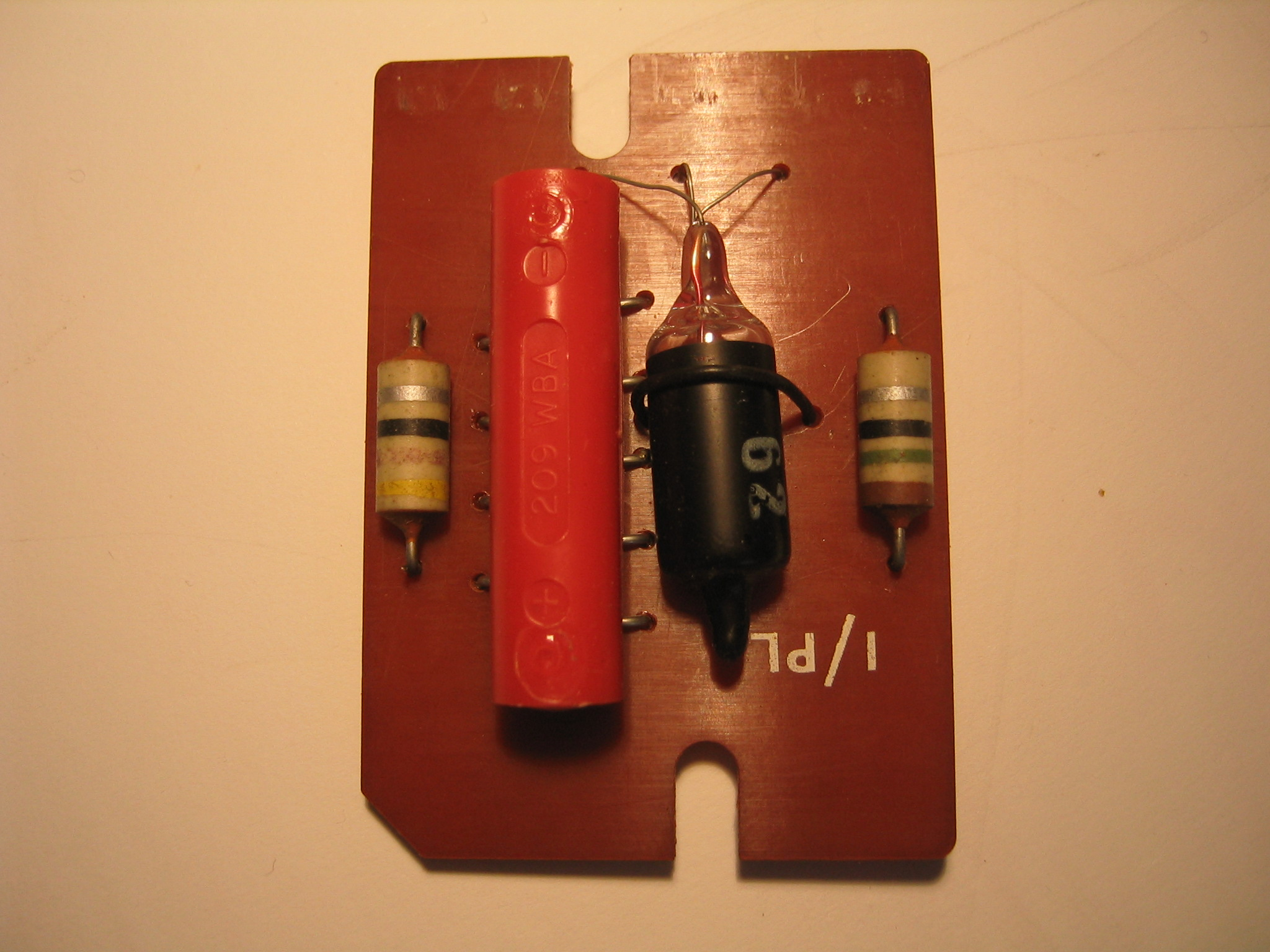
706 Regulator unit, the red part being a string of diodes and the glass part are the thermistors. The thermistor is painted black to stop the glow being shown

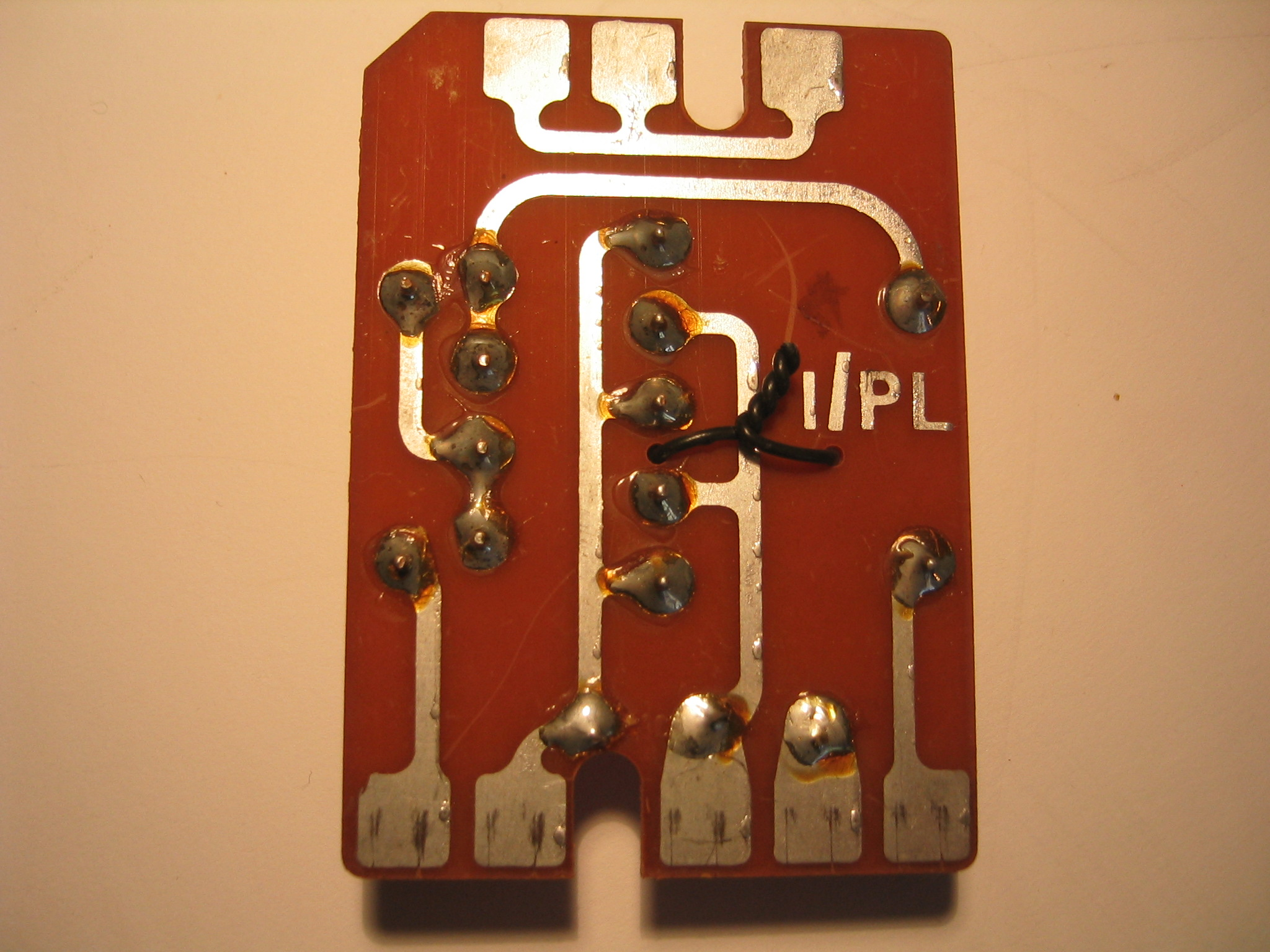
706 Regulator reverse]

The 706 style telephone was also produced for non GPO subscribers by many of the same manufacturers that produced telephones for the GPO. These telephones can be identified by having no "706" reference on the underside and will usually have the manufacturer's own reference instead. Whilst most of these phones were superficially similar to the GPO 706 many had different internal parts including "tropicalised" versions for countries with high humidity or potential insect ingress.

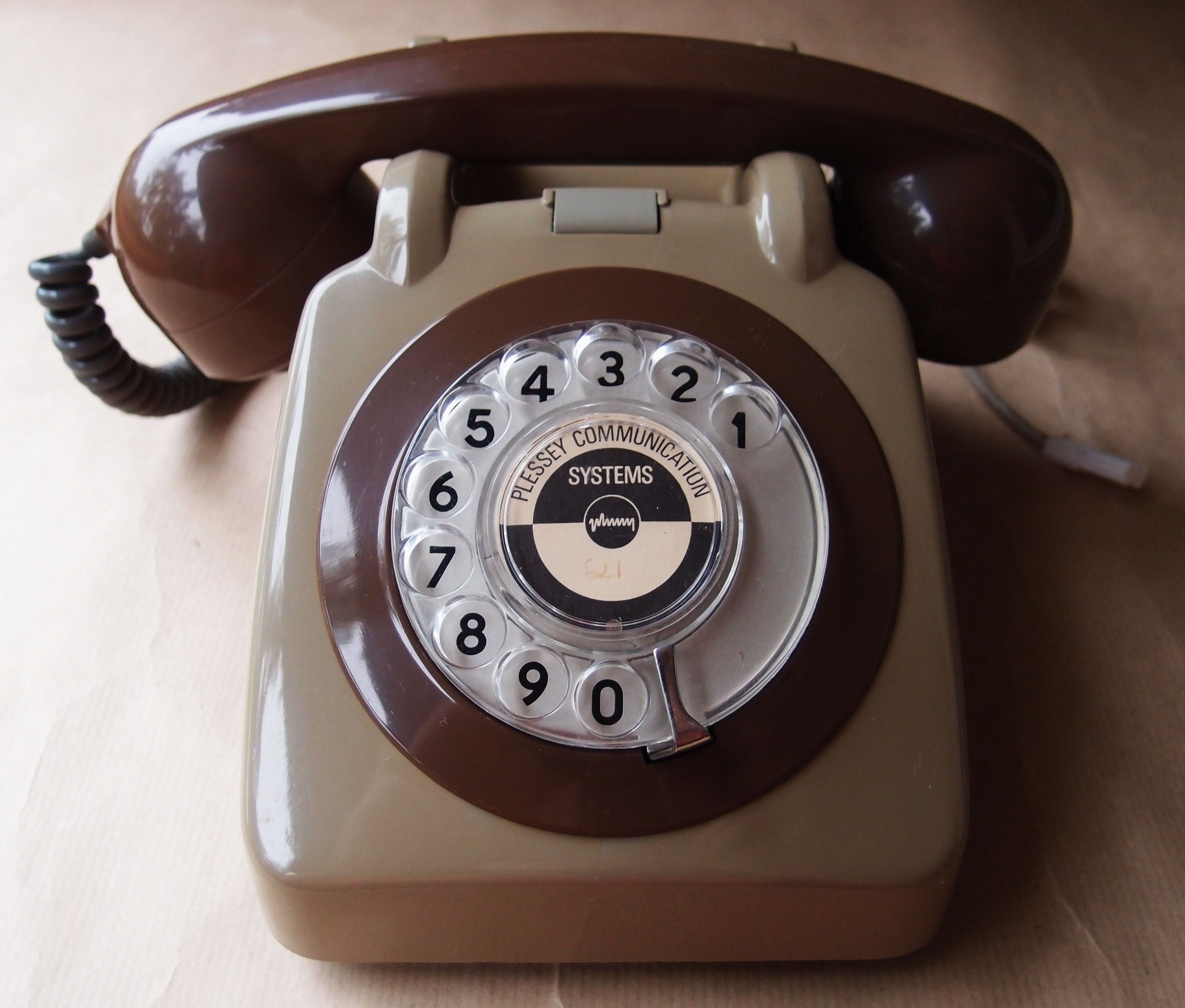
TMA7214 built by The Telephone Manufacturing Co in 1979 using electronic parts similar to the contemporary 746.

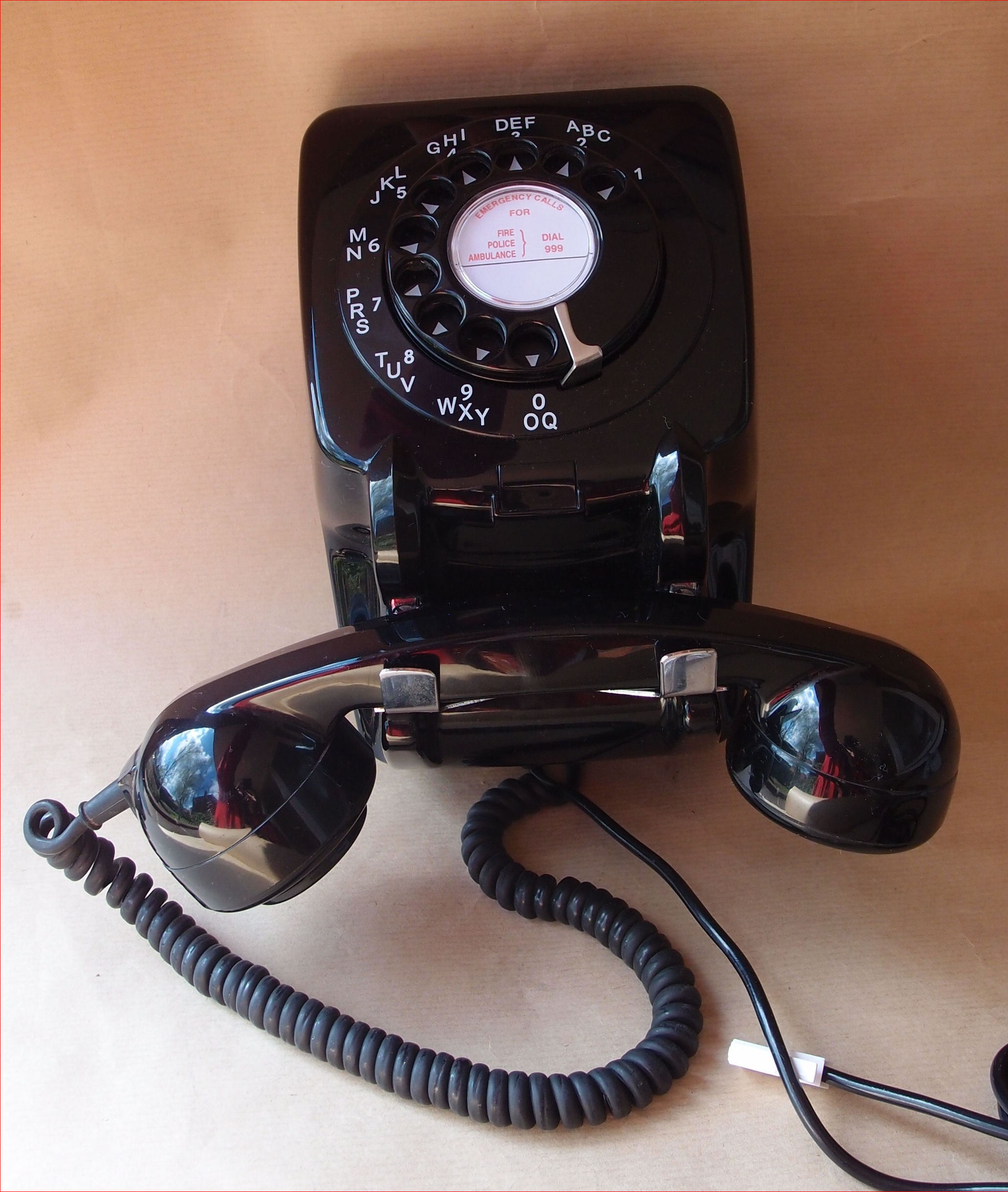
Ericsson Etelphone with optional wall mounting kit

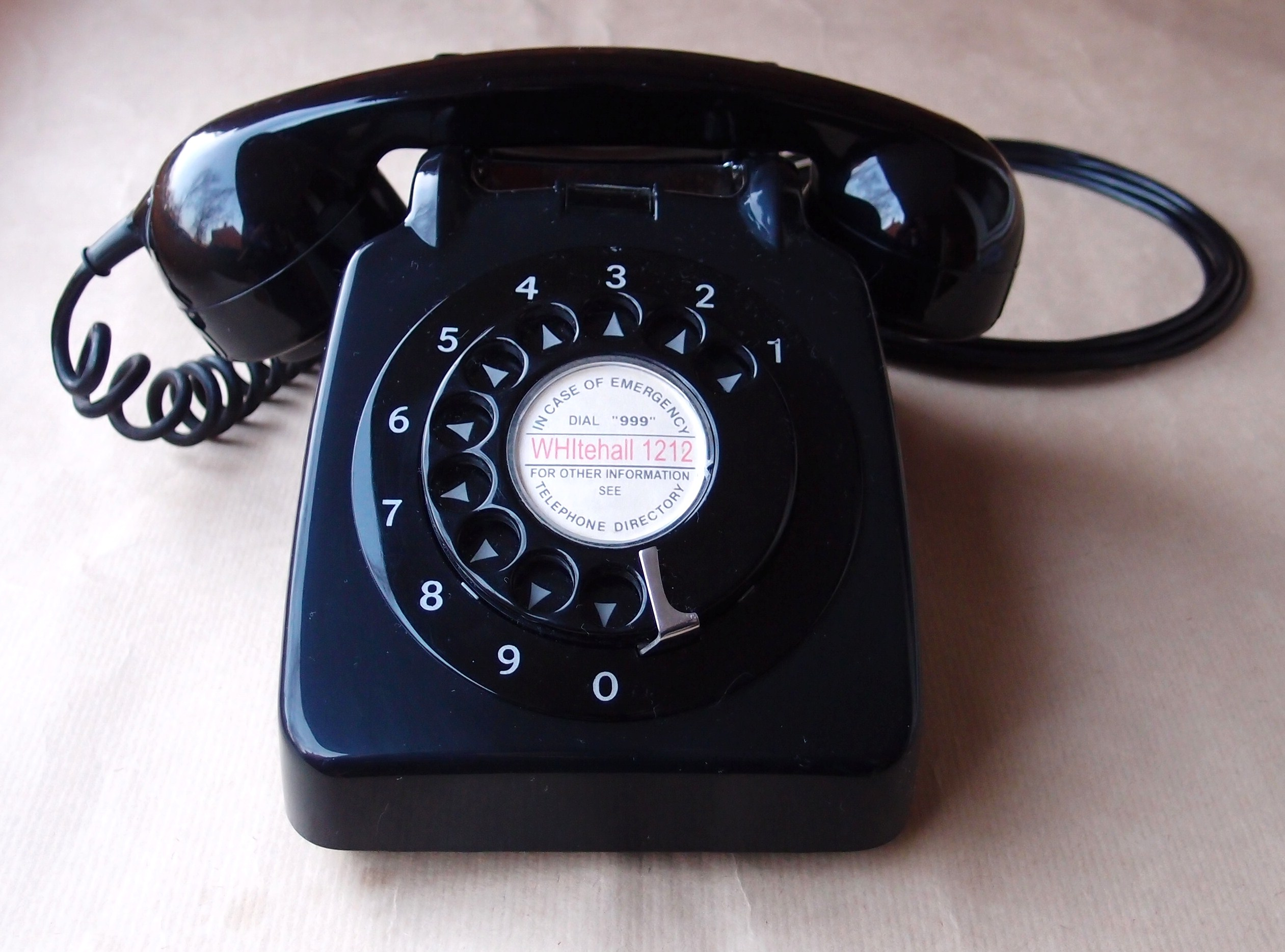
GEC New Gecophone

NB: There were a number of hybrid types between the 300 and 700 series. These appeared as 332s but fitted with a 700 series handset and cord. Among these were the 'intrinsically safe telephones', which had 323 style bodies of a sealed metal construction in a grey hammer finish. They were for installation in environments where there was a risk of fire or explosion from sparks, such as mines and chemical plants.

The 700 series was much more than just a single instrument. There were the Teles. 710, 746, the 711/741 wall phones, pendant telephones, headsets, re-styled bellsets, connection blocks and distribution panels. A full, matching range. Then there was the HES3.

== House Exchange System No. 3 ==
All 700 series telephone instruments came with at least one knockout forward of the switchooks, for installing bell on/bell off switches for instance. Some, however, the Tele. 710, came with four smaller knockouts and, if you looked inside the case, two circular ones too, top right and left of the dial aperture. These, along with a host of unused holes and bracketry, on the chassis, were a source of mystery for a time. Until, that is, the small business successor to the 300 series, House Exchange System 1 was revealed. The 700 series, HES 3.

This comprised, up to, five stations, all of which could call one another and make, answer or transfer calls. All of the parts of this system had to be built up, on site, by the installer, from an assortment of anonymous-looking cardboard boxes and plastic bags. After installing the fixed wiring and external power supply, up to, five ordinary-looking 710Ls had to be transformed into Extension Stations by removing all the knockouts and stuffing them with an incredible amount of springs, wiring and lights. Incredibly, two of the knockouts could wind up, for a full system, containing two pushbuttons each, one for each of the other four stations, L-shaped to cram them into the small holes. That made a total of two supervisory lamps and six buttons on what, outwardly, seemed a normal, domestic telephone instrument.

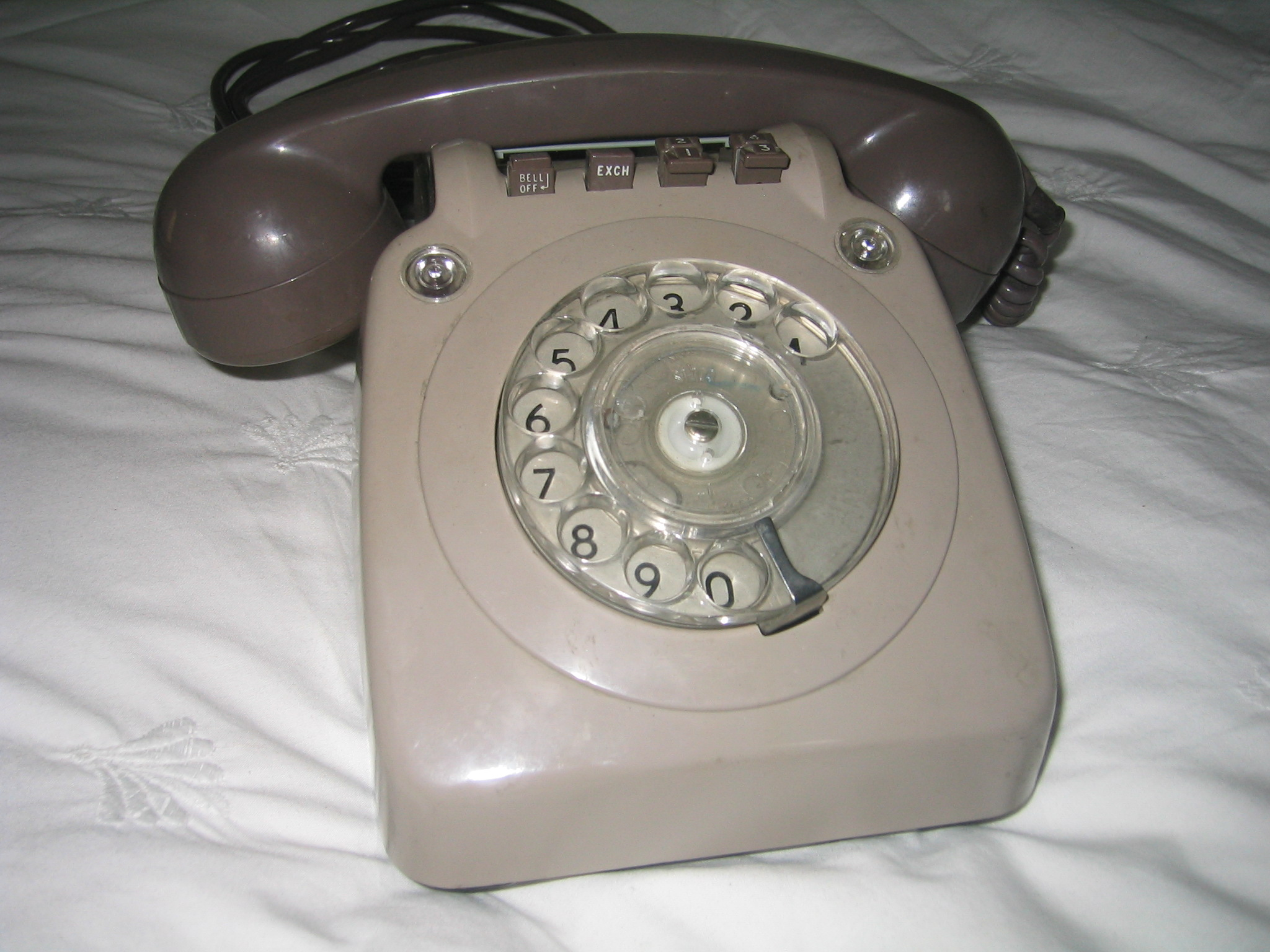
Probably the ultimate development of the 700 series telephones. A HES 3(House Exchange System) built into the shell of a 710 telephone.

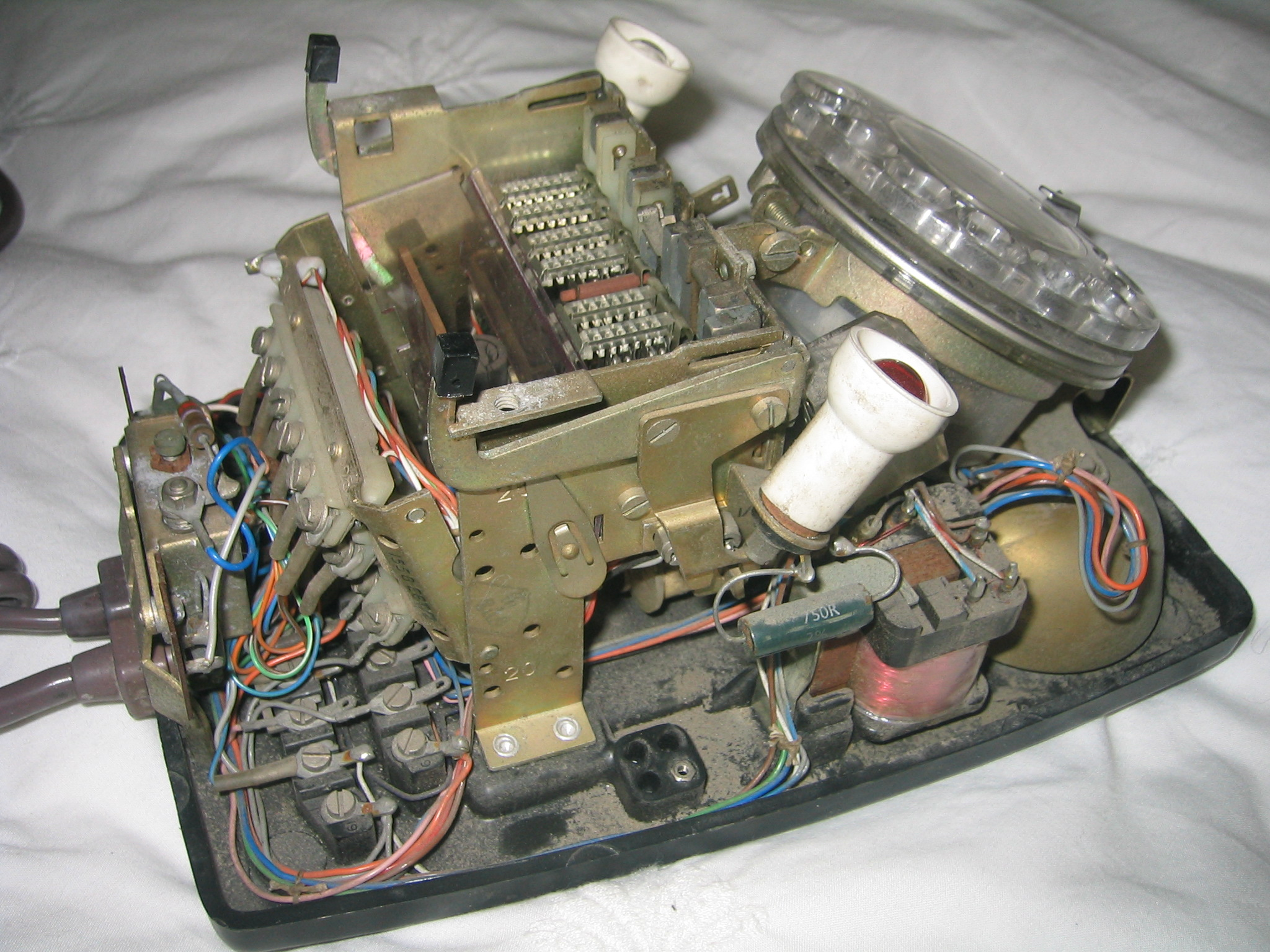
Showing the inside of an HES 3 instrument, crammed with parts

== Type 710 ==
This was the same as a 706 but had four possible buttons or lamps fitted at the top of the case. Dummy buttons were used where neither button nor lamp was used. The ultimate task of the Tele. 710L was that of being transformed into an Extension Station of a House Exchange System No.3. (see above)

== Type 711 wall-mounted ==
Initially with the 700 series, when a subscriber (customer) ordered a wall-mounted telephone, the attending fitter would have to requisition a standard Tele. 706L, a Bracket No. 6 and a modified, stainless steel, switch-hook assembly. On site the 706 would have its case removed, the front two feet knocked out, the instrument cord removed and the dial turned round through 180 degrees. The bracket was then screwed to the wall, the baseplate mounted on the bracket and the fixed wiring, having been led in via a hole in the baseplate, was terminated in place of the instrument cord. The two metal bezels by which the case was fastened to the chassis were removed and replaced by the new switchhook assembly. This had a bridging piece, like the carrying handle, but with two large hooks to stop the handset falling to the floor. If the instrument had an early dial bezel, carrying the letters and numbers, then this too had to be rotated 180 degrees. When reassembled, the result was an untidy compromise. It looked like what it was, an upside-down 706 with its handset hanging ungainly from the bottom and the curly cord dangling beneath. It was a relief to all concerned when all the above became unnecessary with the introduction of a purpose-built instrument.

Tele. 711L

This was, essentially, a 706 base with a modified chassis and case. First introduced in 1961, it too could have either a steel or plastic base and wired or printed circuit internals, depending upon the manufacturer. It was supplied with the T-shaped Bracket no.6. The hooks on the top of the bracket located into the holes usually filled by the front feet. A single screw then secured the rear (bottom) of the baseplate to the bracket's upright. Only two rubber feet were left in place, to support the lower part of the instrument on the wall. There was no instrument cord, the fixed wiring being led directly in via the oblong hole on the lower left. The picture below shows one of the last 711s, having been made in 1968, the last production year. The 711 was superseded by the 741 shortly afterwards.

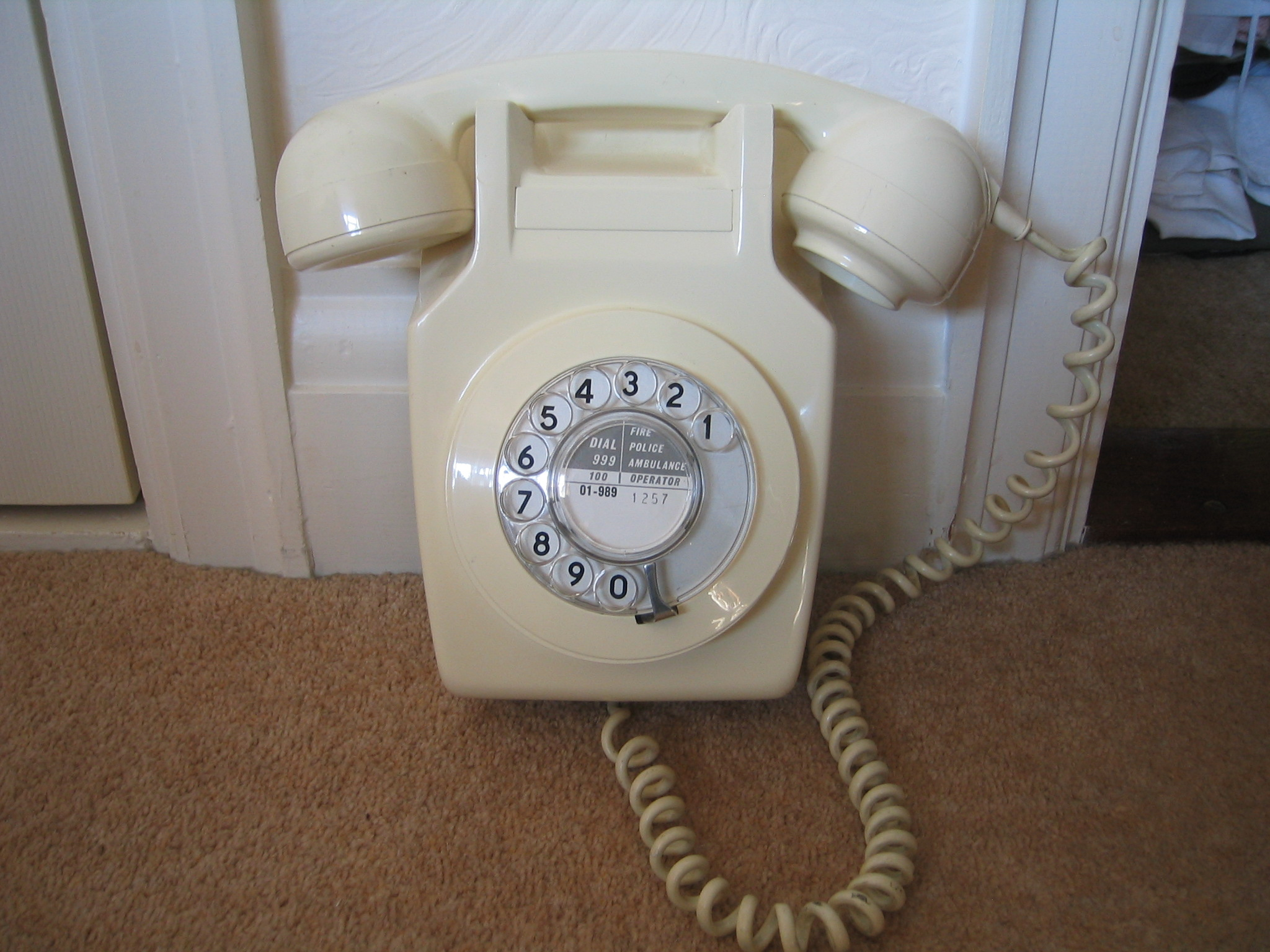
711 Wall mounted Ivory Telephone, strangely photographed sitting on the floor.

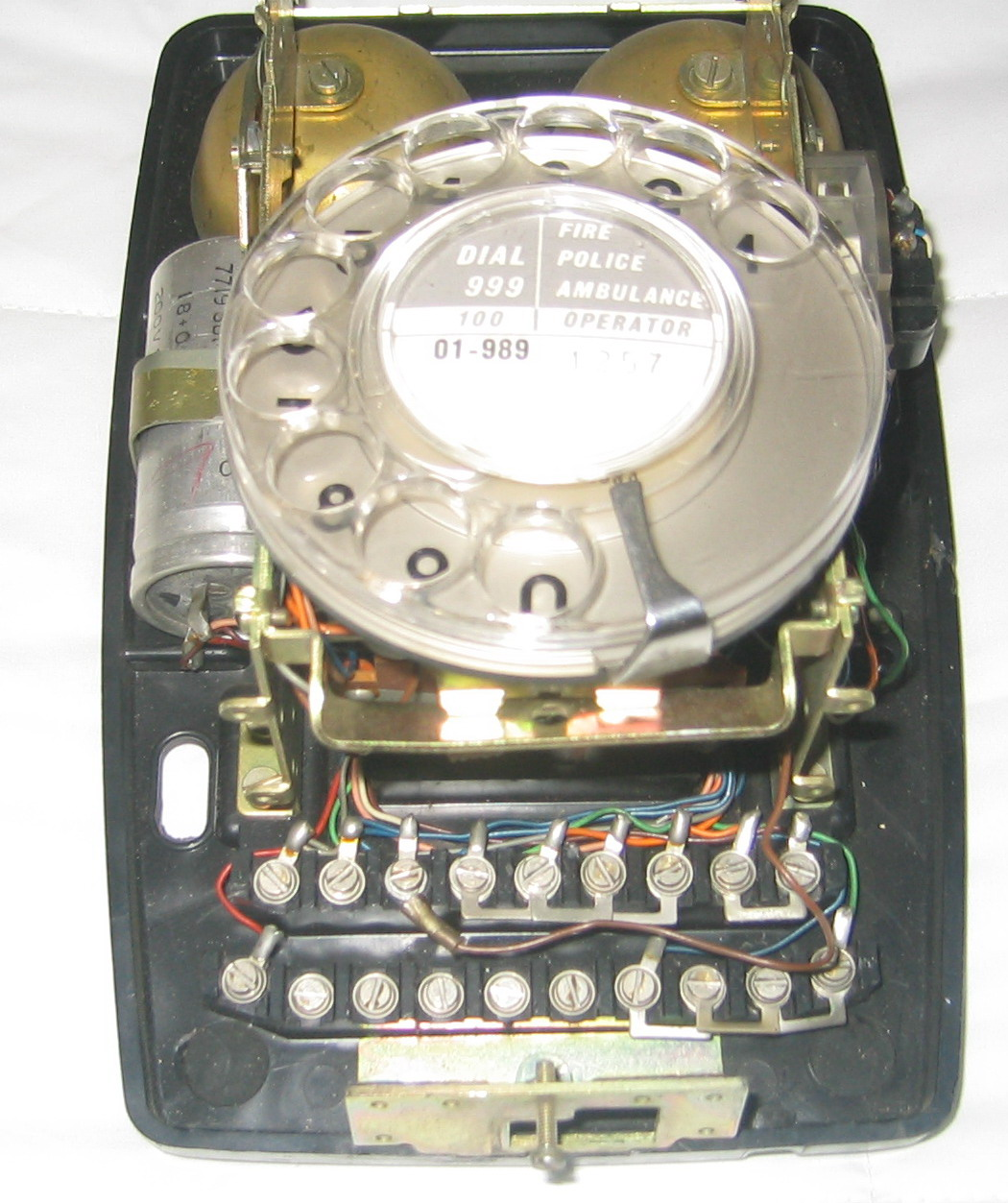
The inside of the 711, wired with no PCB, shown without handset attached

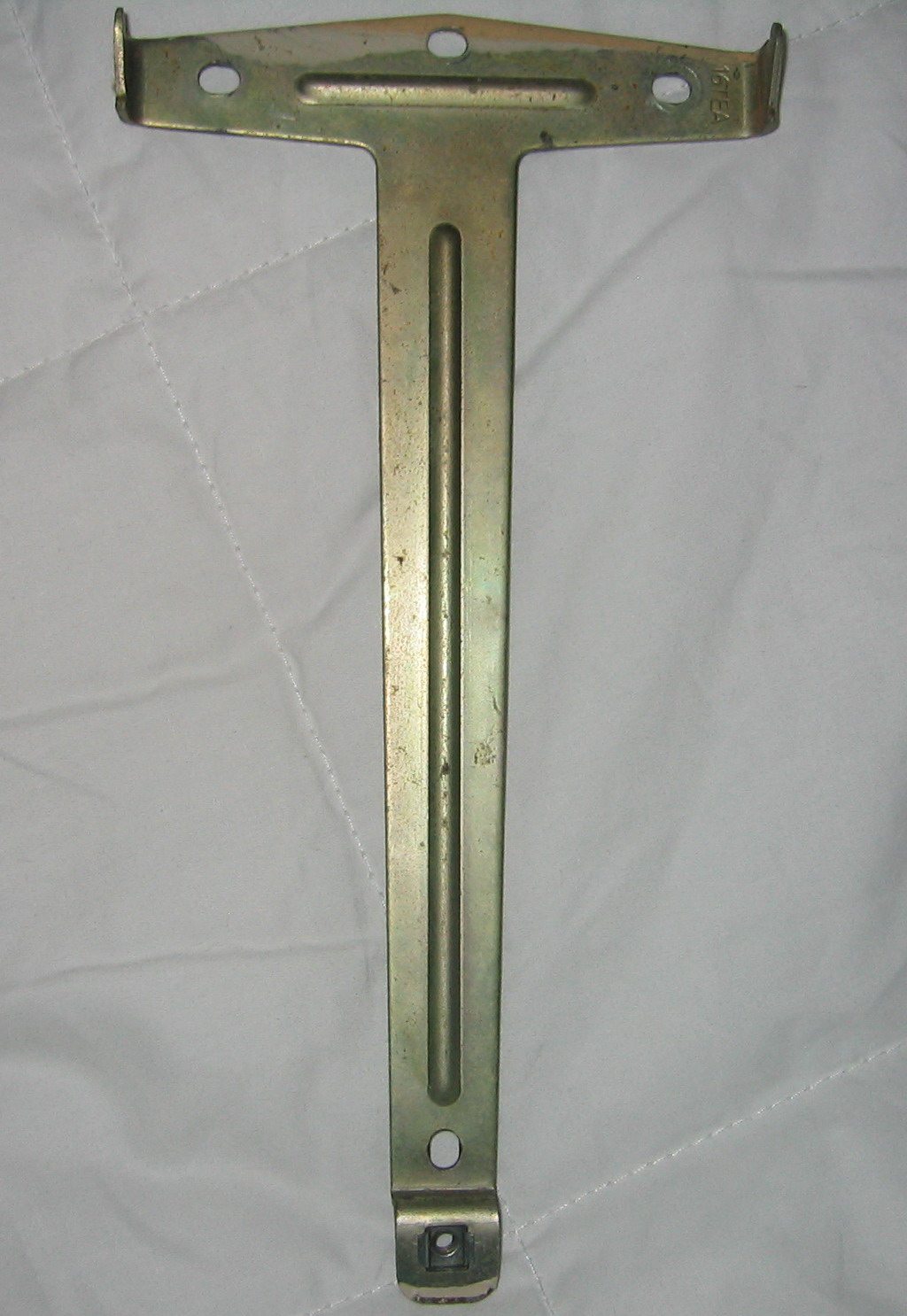
Telephone Bracket No. 6 required for mounting wall telephones and other devices

== Type 712/722 Trimphone ==
The GPO introduced the Trimphone in the late 1960s as an alternative to its standard telephone, this new phone featured a distinctive warbling ring as opposed to the traditional bell. Subscribers had to pay extra for the Trimphone. The original design by Martyn Rowlands dates from 1964. It won a COID Design Award in 1966. Anthony Wedgwood Benn (the then Postmaster-General) presented the first one to a subscriber in 1965, but it was not available to everyone until 1968. The name "Trimphone" is apparently a partial acronym; Tone Ringing Illuminated Model.

The original Trimphone was the 712 however it took a number of revisions to get right and a much improved model, the 722 came along in 1966 and was released as the 1/722 with a revised version, the 1/722 MOD, following swiftly on its heels. A further improved version, the 2/722, then became the standard issue in late 1971. With the advent of new style wiring the model numbers were prefixed with an '8' and were fitted with a 4000Ω high impedance ringer and a new style line cord fitted with a 431A plug. Push-button models were introduced in the 70s and the final version of the Trimphone was the Phoenix phone, available in a range of new colours known as The Snowdon Collection which came in out 1982.

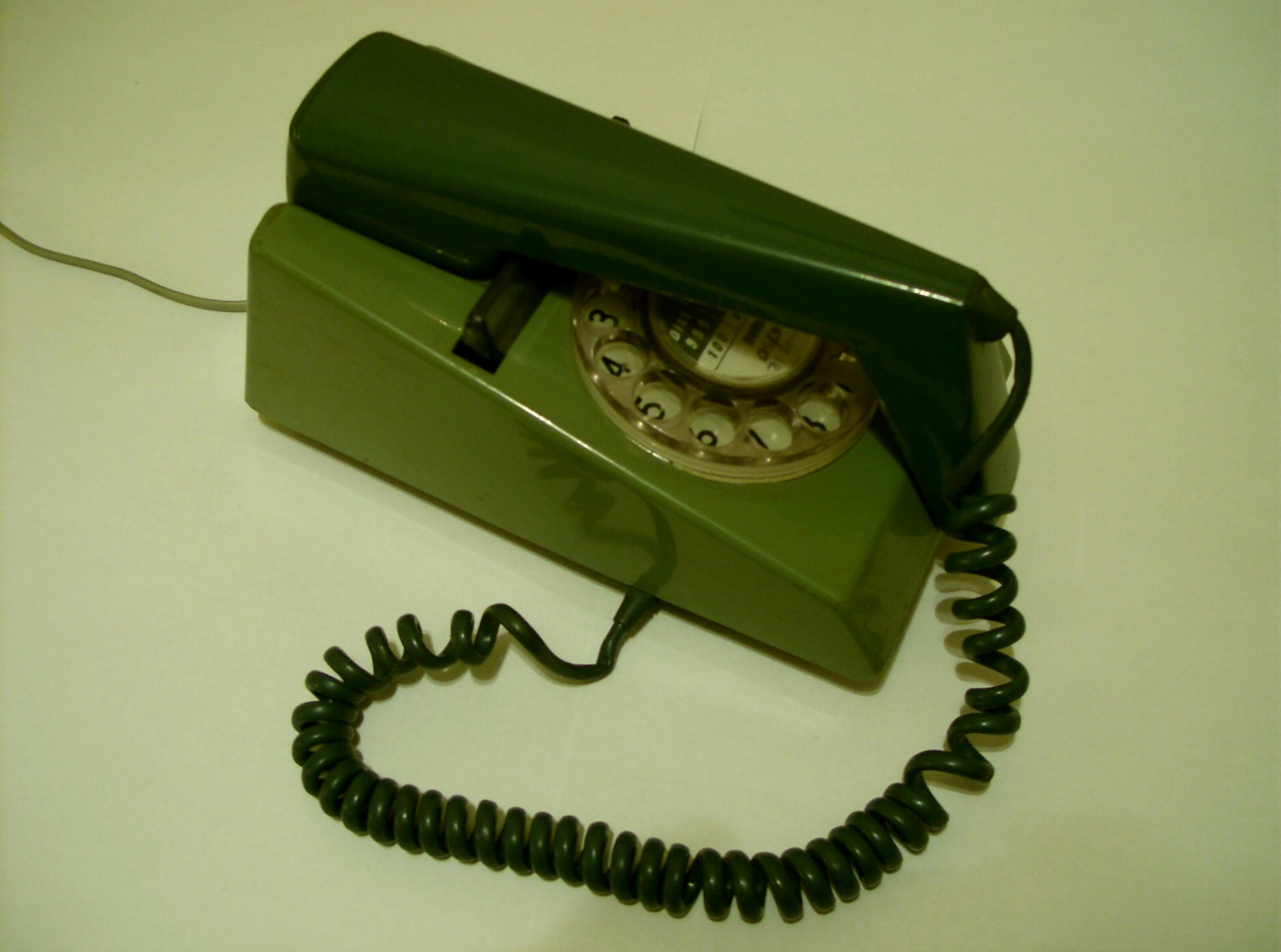
An original Tele. 722, Trimphone, two tone green

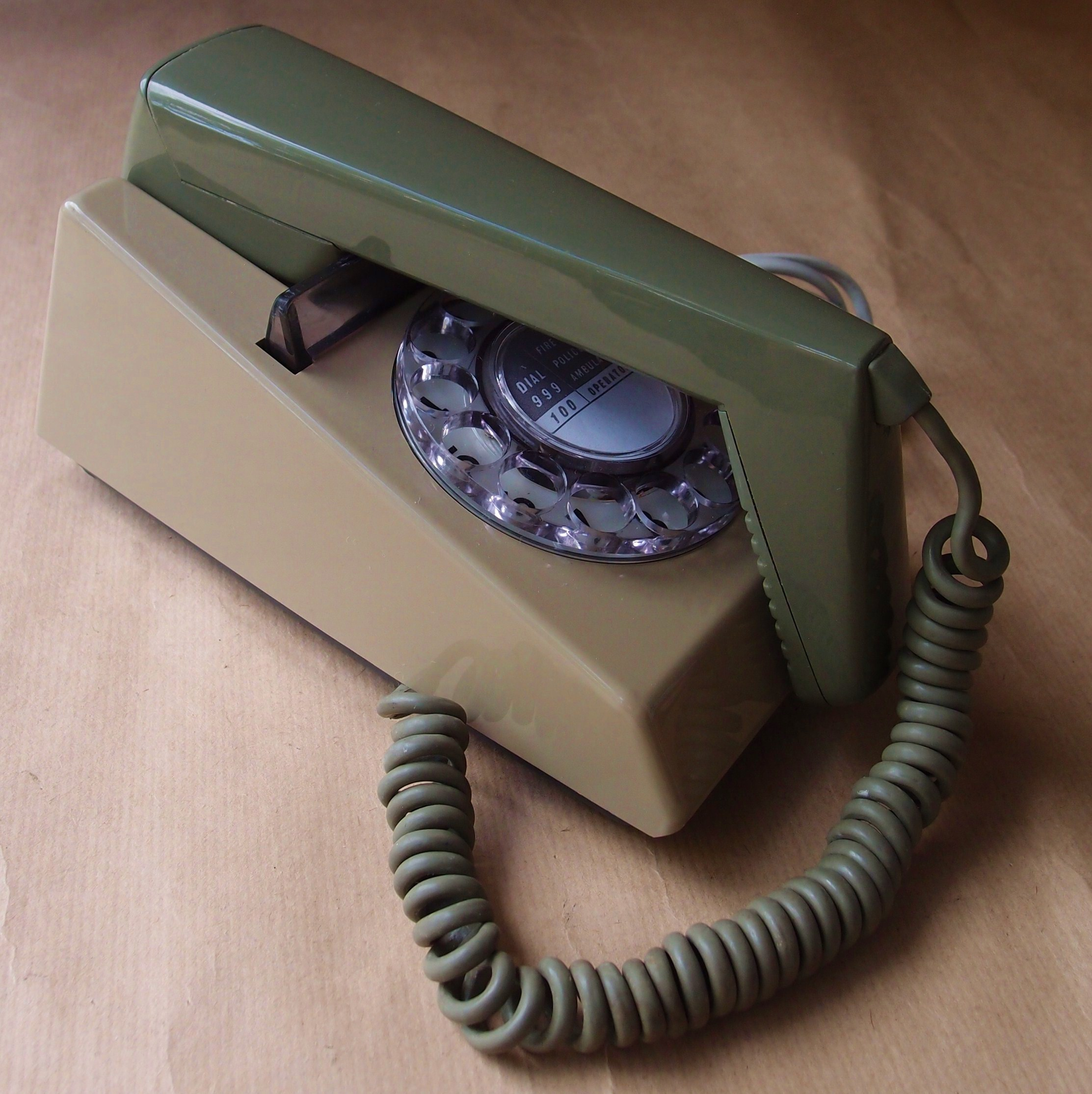
1969 1/722F MOD grey & green Trimphone telephone

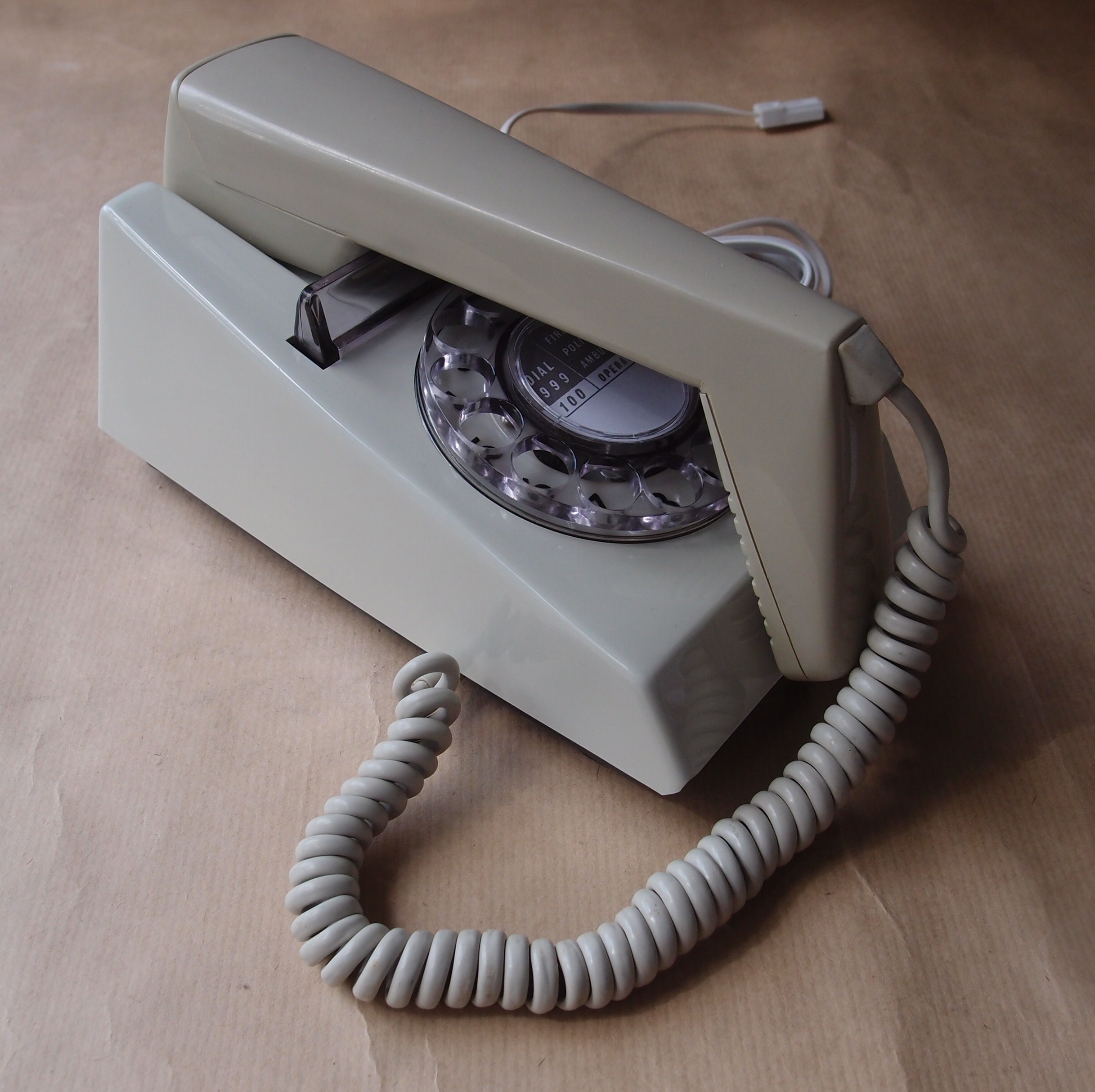
1971 1/722F grey & white Trimphone telephone - one of the last of this type

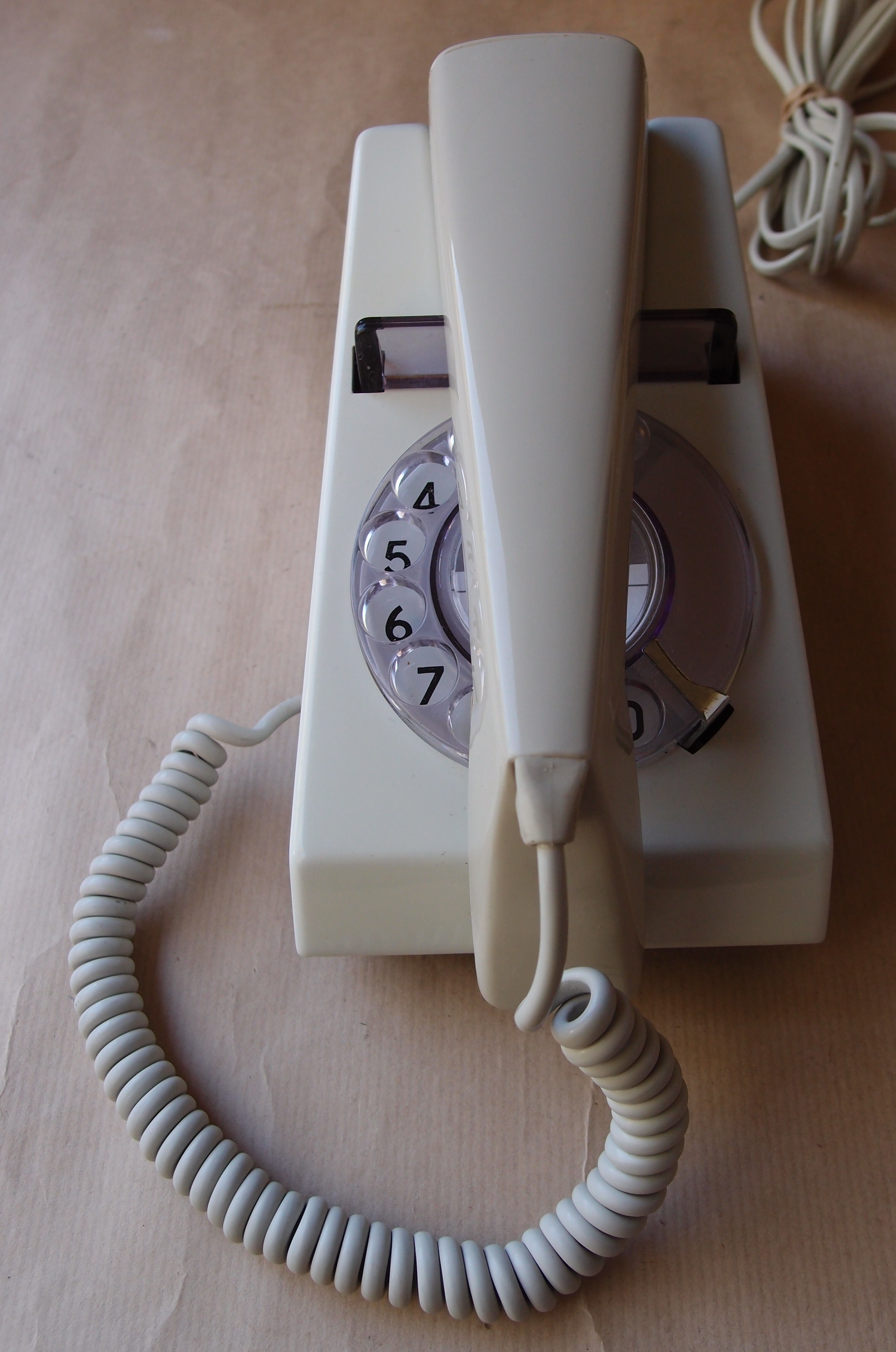
1971 2/722F grey & white Trimphone telephone - one of the first of this type

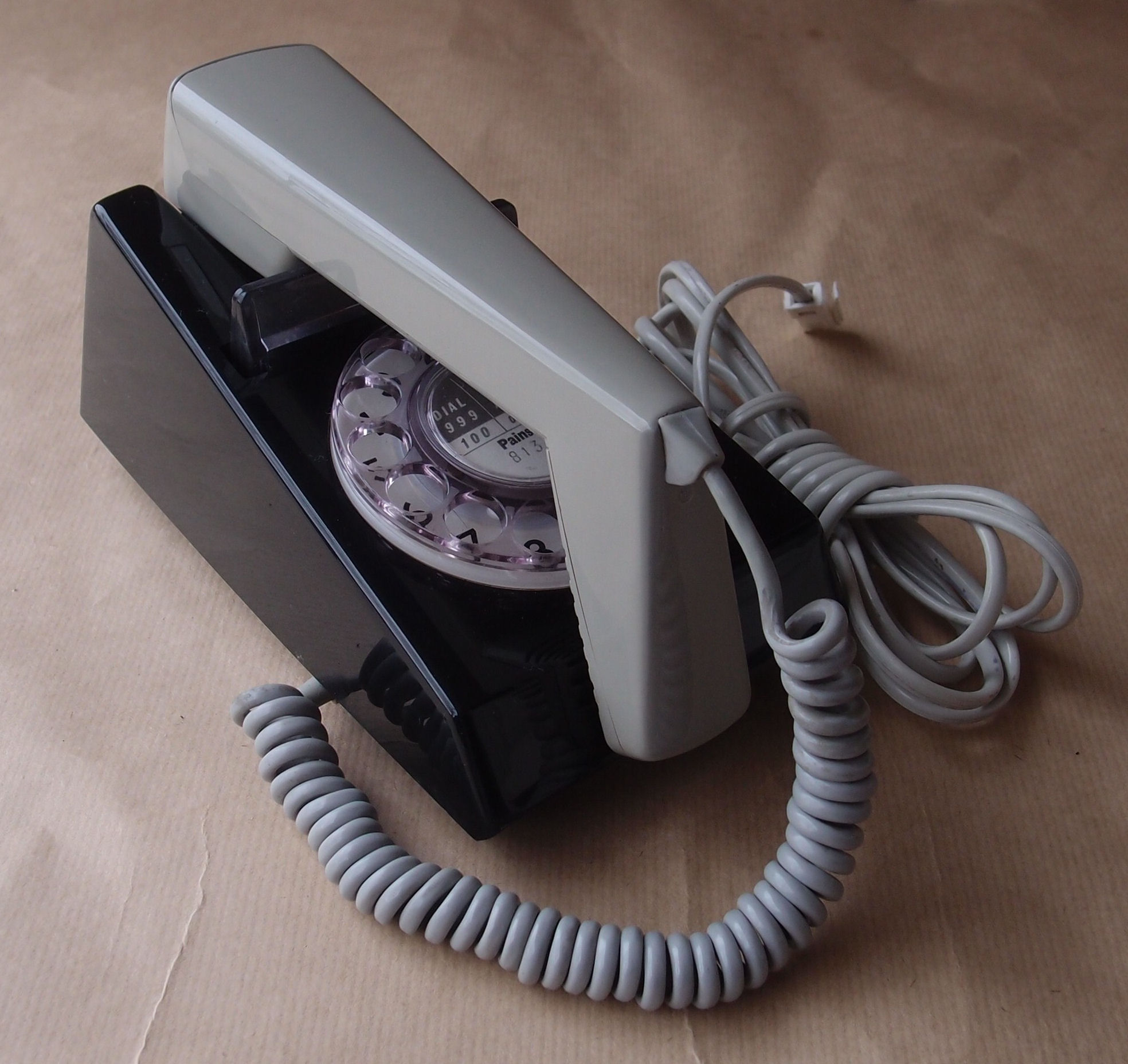
1982 8722G Snowdon Collection Trimphone telephone in black and grey

== Type 726 ==
In the UK, a brief excursion from standards, GPO telecoms introduced in 1967 their first push-button telephone, the GPO 726 (Ericsson N2000 series), that used neither pulse dialing nor DTMF tones. It used a DC signalling system comprising a number of rectifier diodes arranged in different polarity configuration according to the button pressed. The 726 also required a ground wire as well as the usual A and B wires. The irony was that the dial signal still had to be converted to pulses in the host PABX.

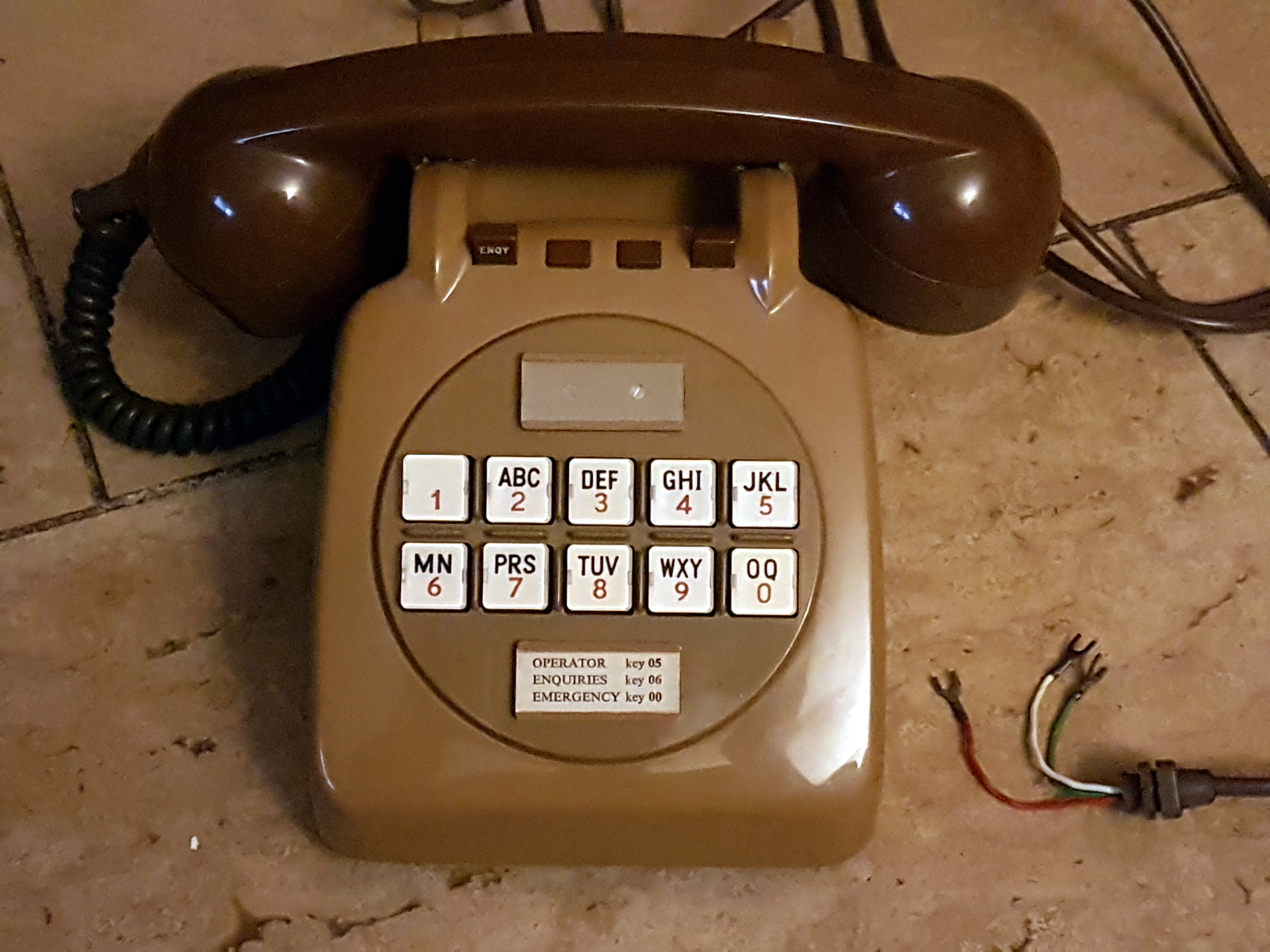
GPO 726 Phone

== Type 741 wall-mounted ==
The Telephone 741 was first introduced in 1968 to replace the Tele. 711, it had s similar, but slightly more angular case to the 711 but was based on the internals of the Tele. 746, with its integral regulator, extra button capacity and lamp bracketry.

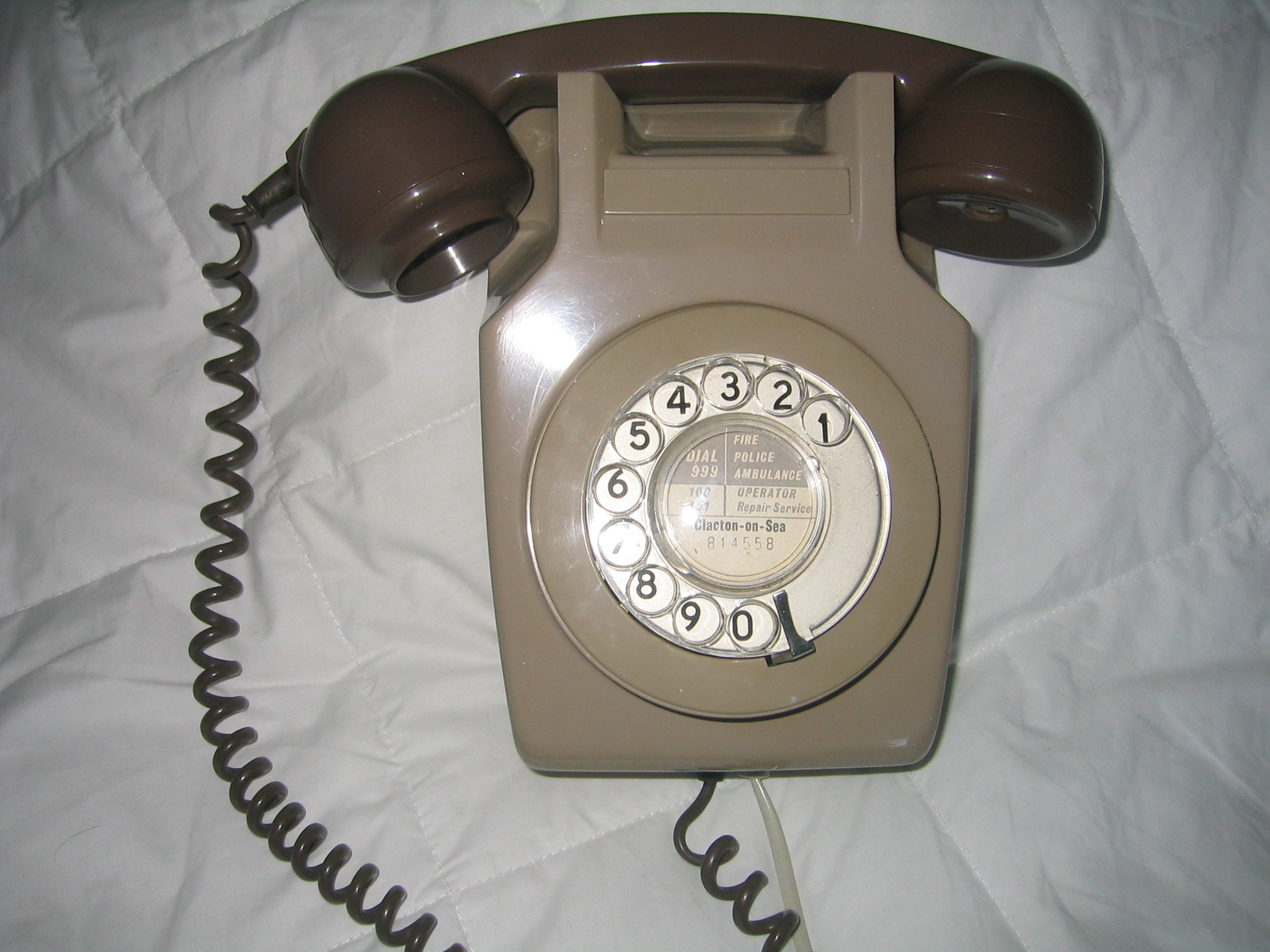
741 wall-mounted two-tone grey telephone

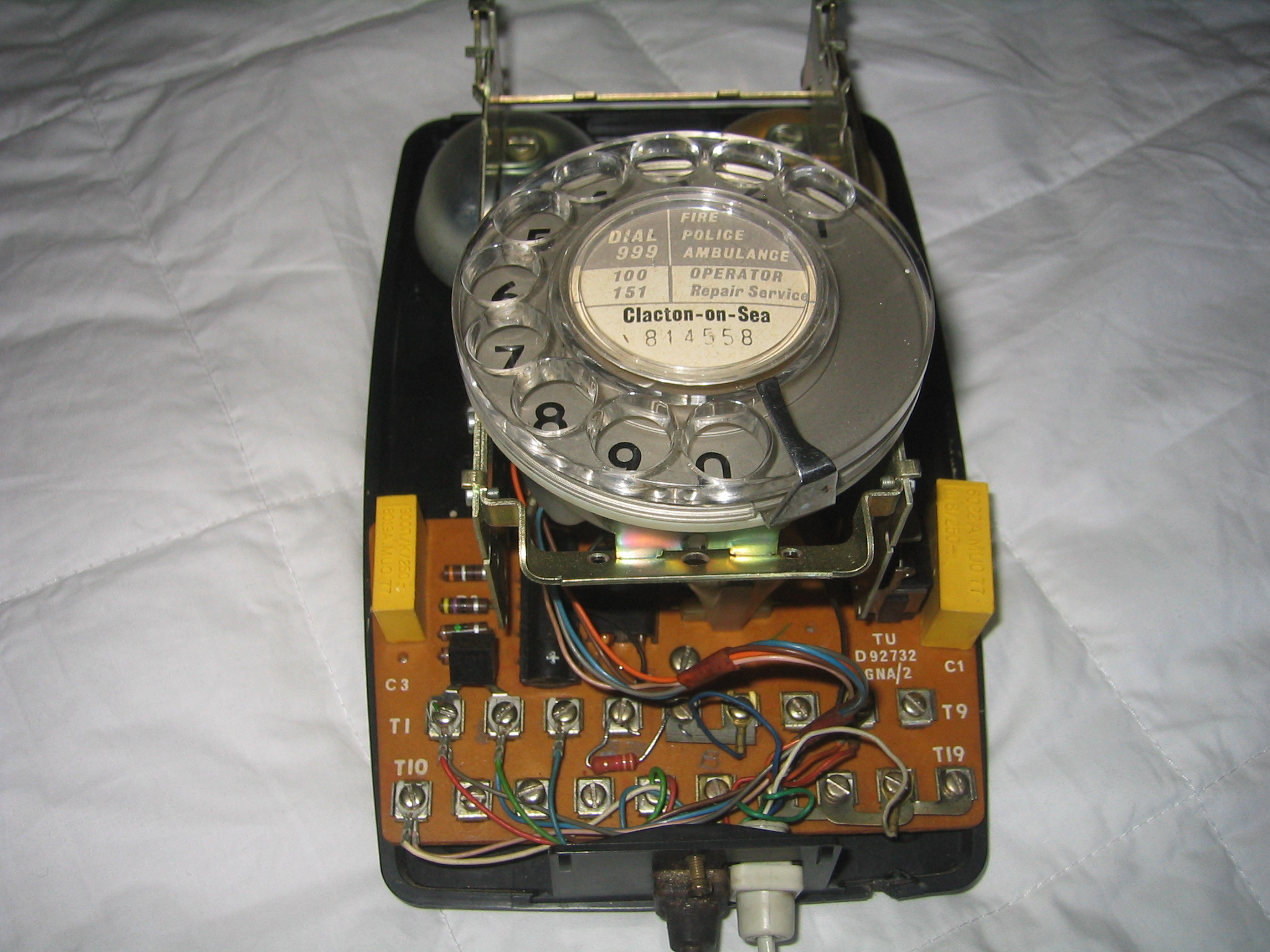
The inside of the 741, with PCB on this metal based example.

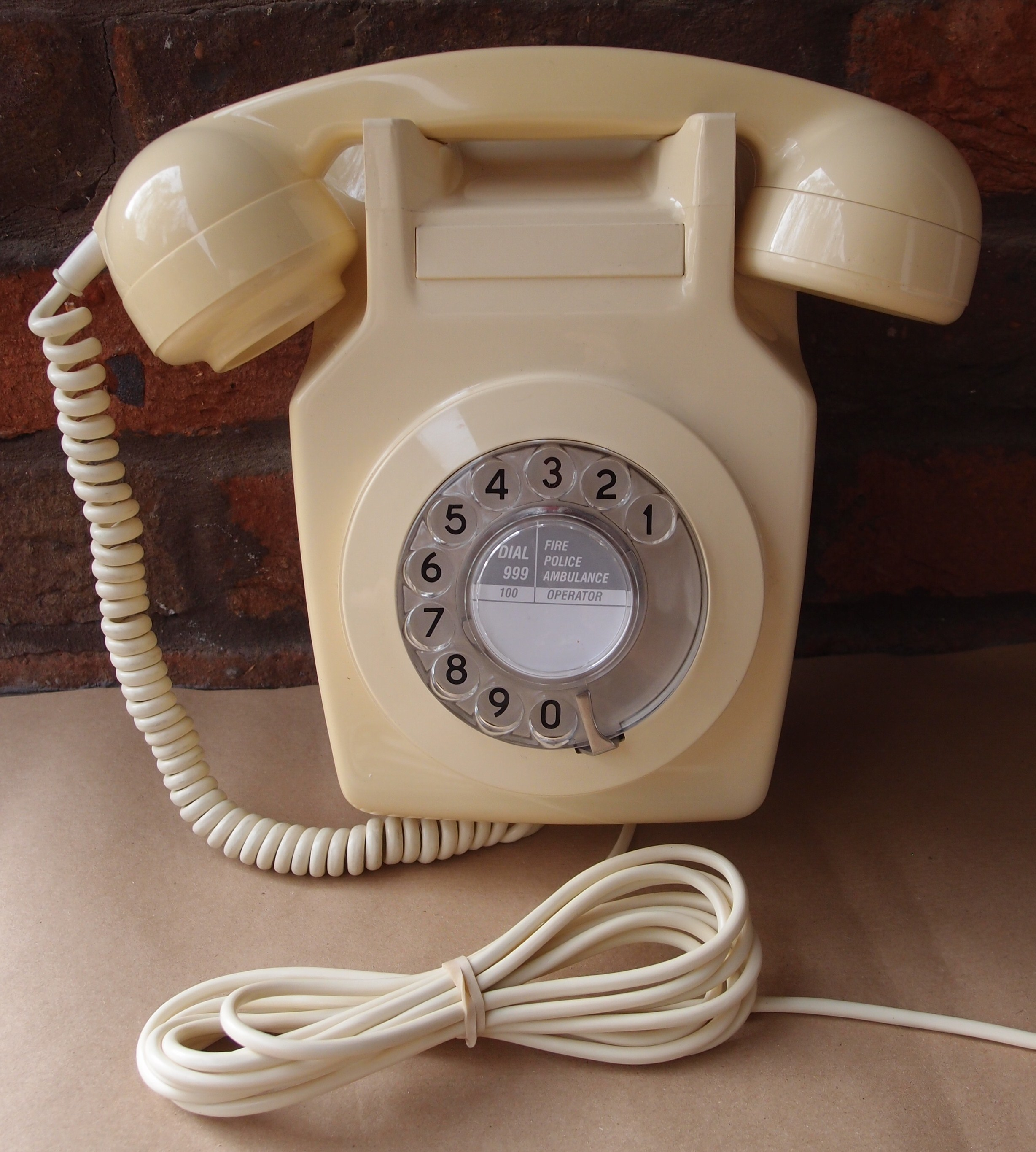
1973 741 wall mounted telephone in ivory.

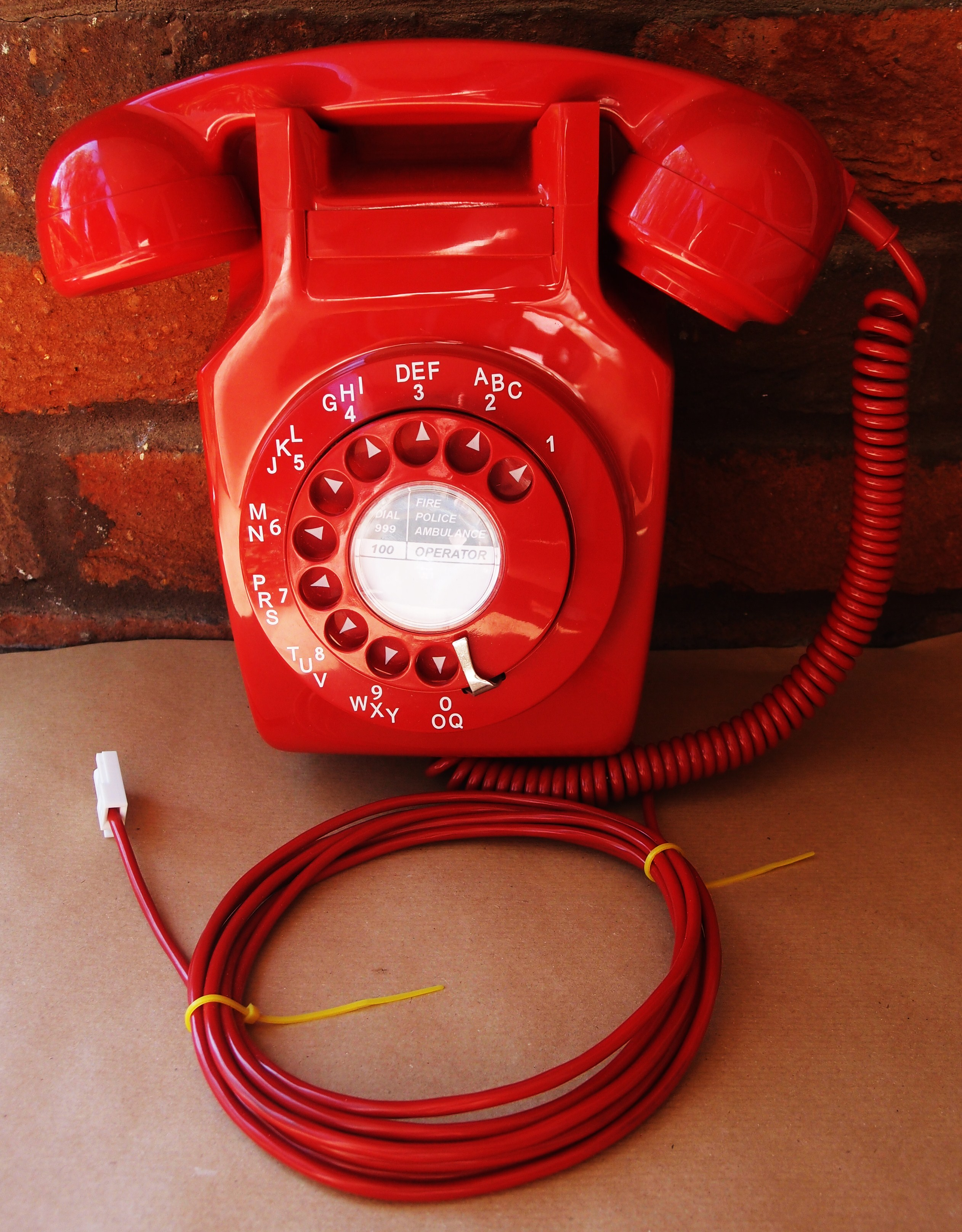
1970 741L Reproduction wall mounted telephone in red. These telephones were only issued to fire services and originally had no dial.

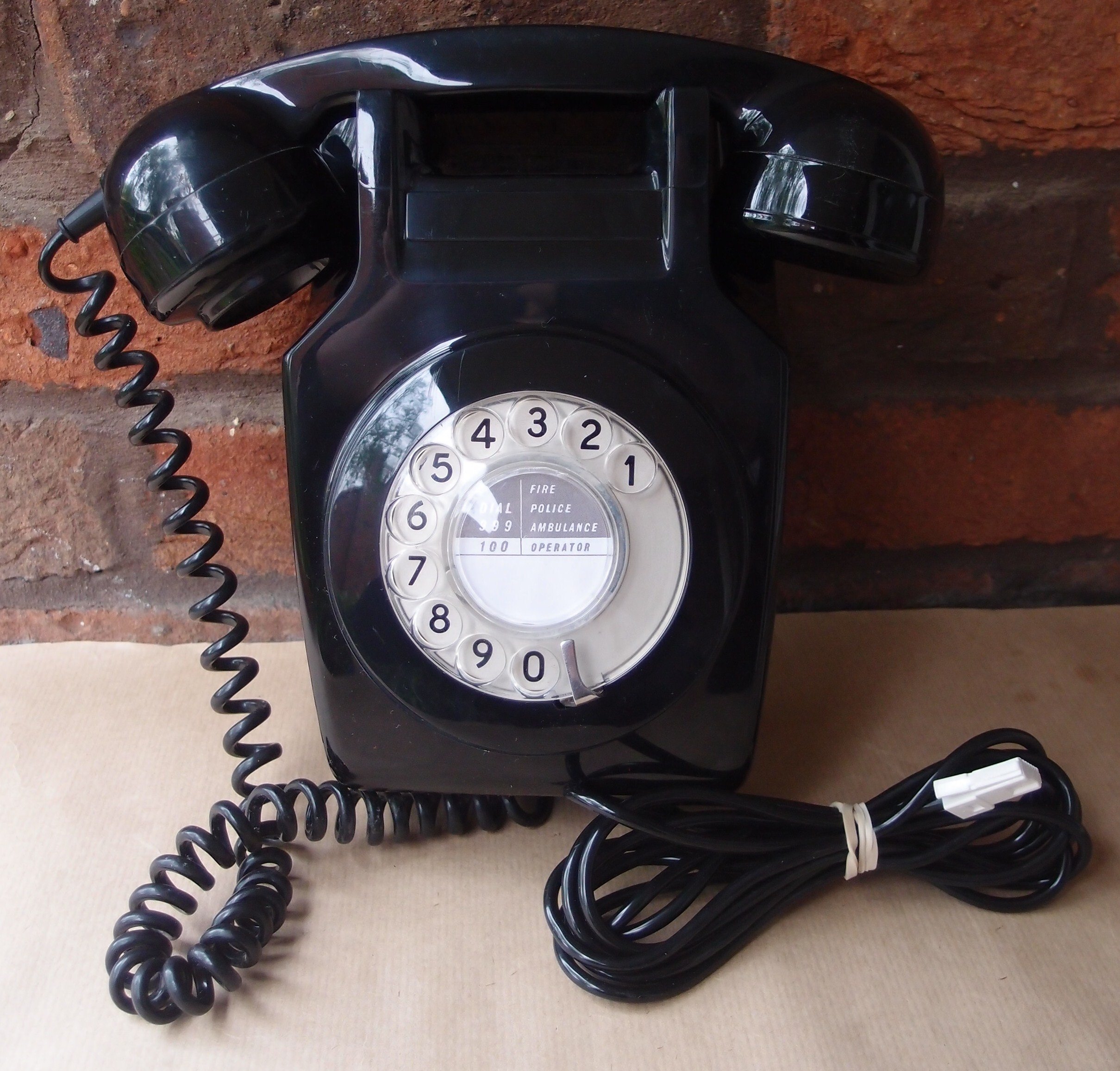
1972 741 wall mounted telephone in black.

== Type 746 ==
This was an updated version of the 706L type. It was introduced in 1967 and looked very similar, although it had a slightly different case design. The 746 "carrying handle" was now an integral part of the moulded 'cow horn' switchhook cradle, whereas the 706 had a removable plastic or metal carrying handle. Originally the case had a slope from above the dial, sloping backwards under the handset; this design was found to allow the handset to slide forward sufficiently to allow the switchhooks to operate, leaving the phone off hook; the case was redesigned to provide a recess to stop the handset sliding forward.

Unlike the 706 type it had a built-in regulator, which could not be removed. When factory modified for the 'New Plan' plug and socket system an 8 was added to the numbers, hence a 746 became an 8746. Then, a brown case colour was then also added to the range.

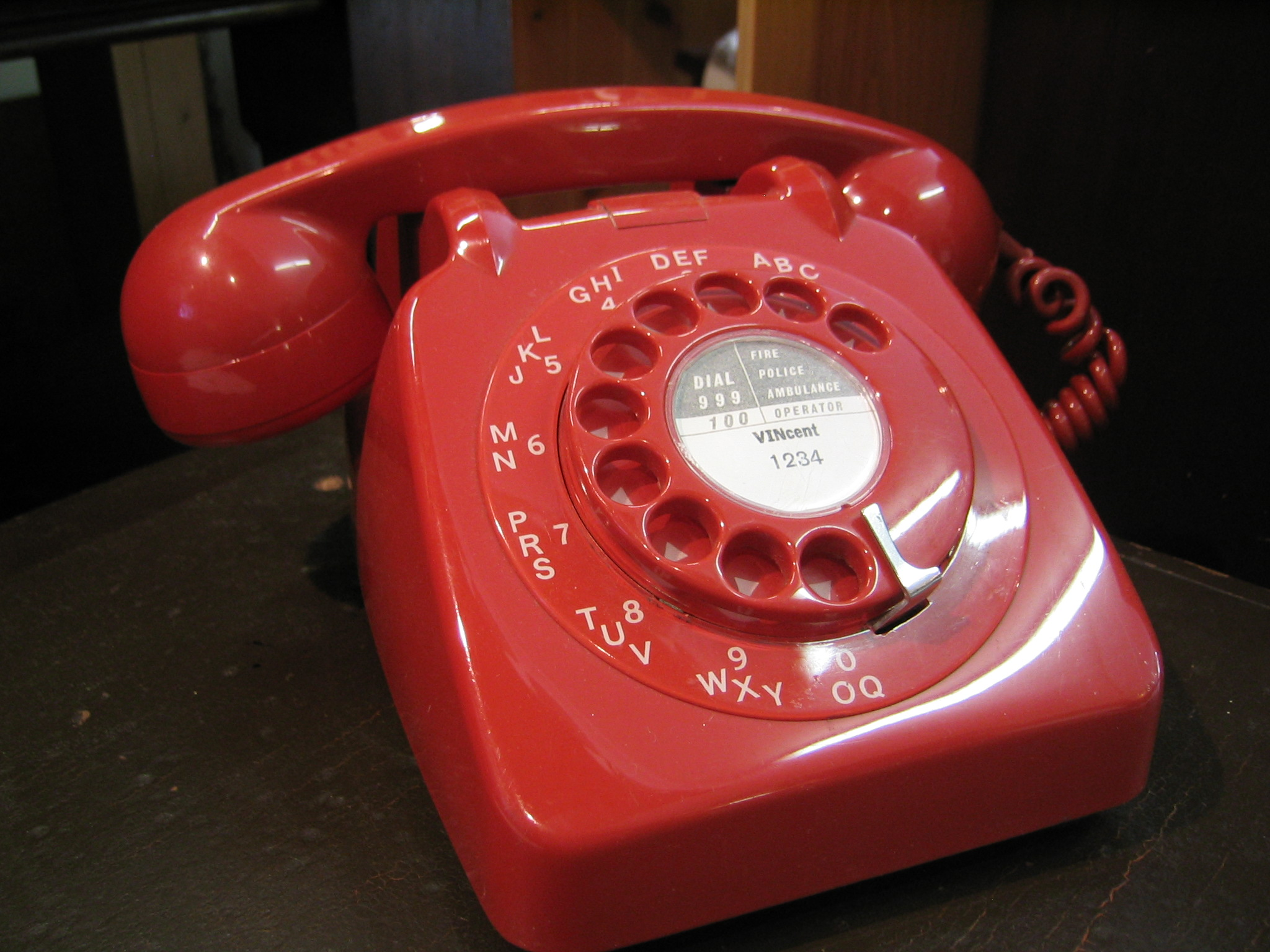
For comparison, a Tele. 706L Red, an early version with coloured dial and lettered outer bezel. Pre. All Number Dialling

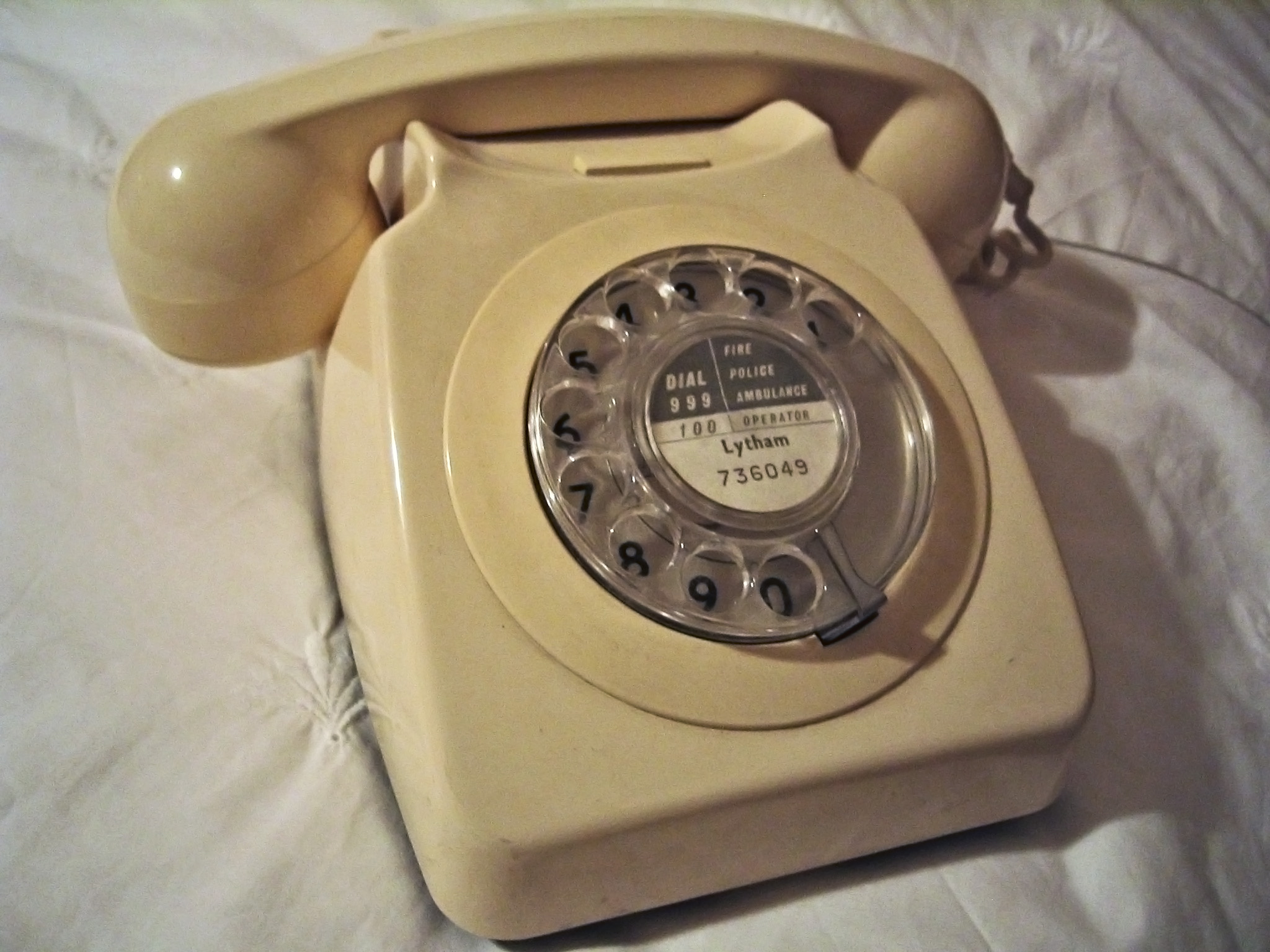
Tele. 8746 Ivory, manufactured in 1984 and still in use today, having been converted to use the 'New Plan' plug and socket system.

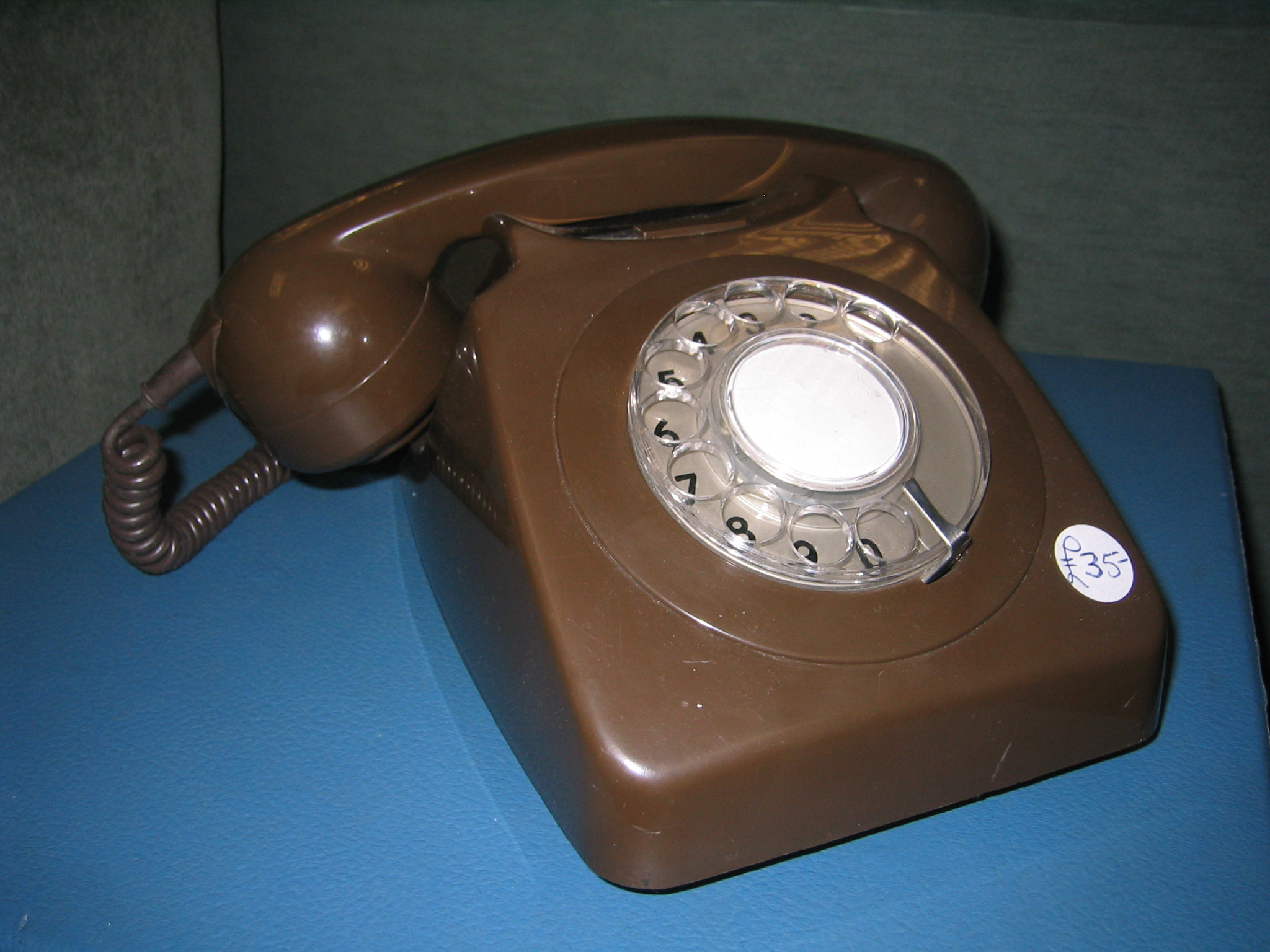
Tele. 8746 Brown, an unusual colour which was added to the range at the introduction of the 'New Plan' socket wiring system. This colourway was known as The Yeoman.

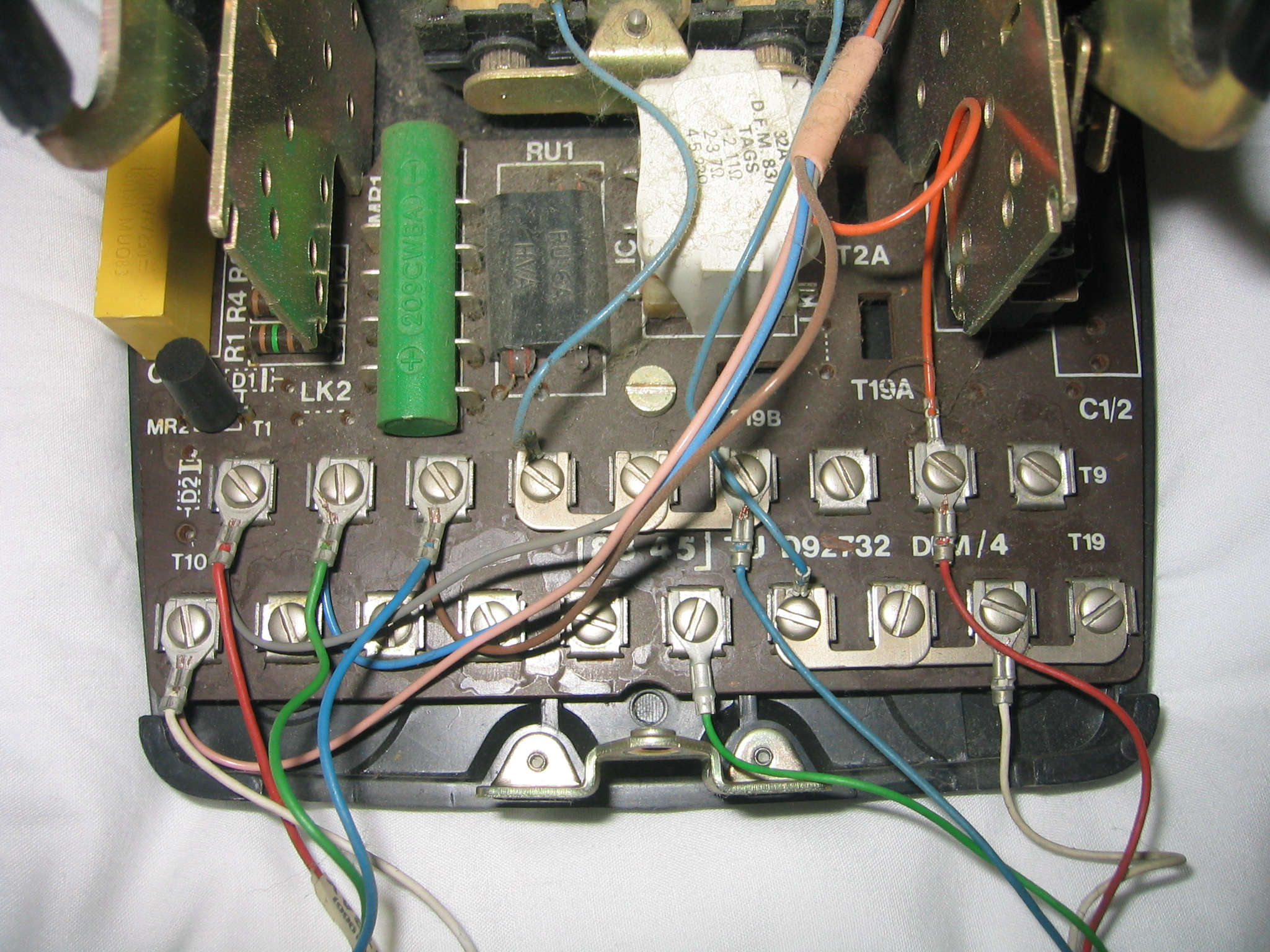
746 Inside showing built-in regulator, which can be identified by the green centipede-like diode pack, beside which are the thermistors

The 746 telephone was initially available in seven colours: black, red, two tone green, two tone grey, topaz yellow, concorde blue and ivory.

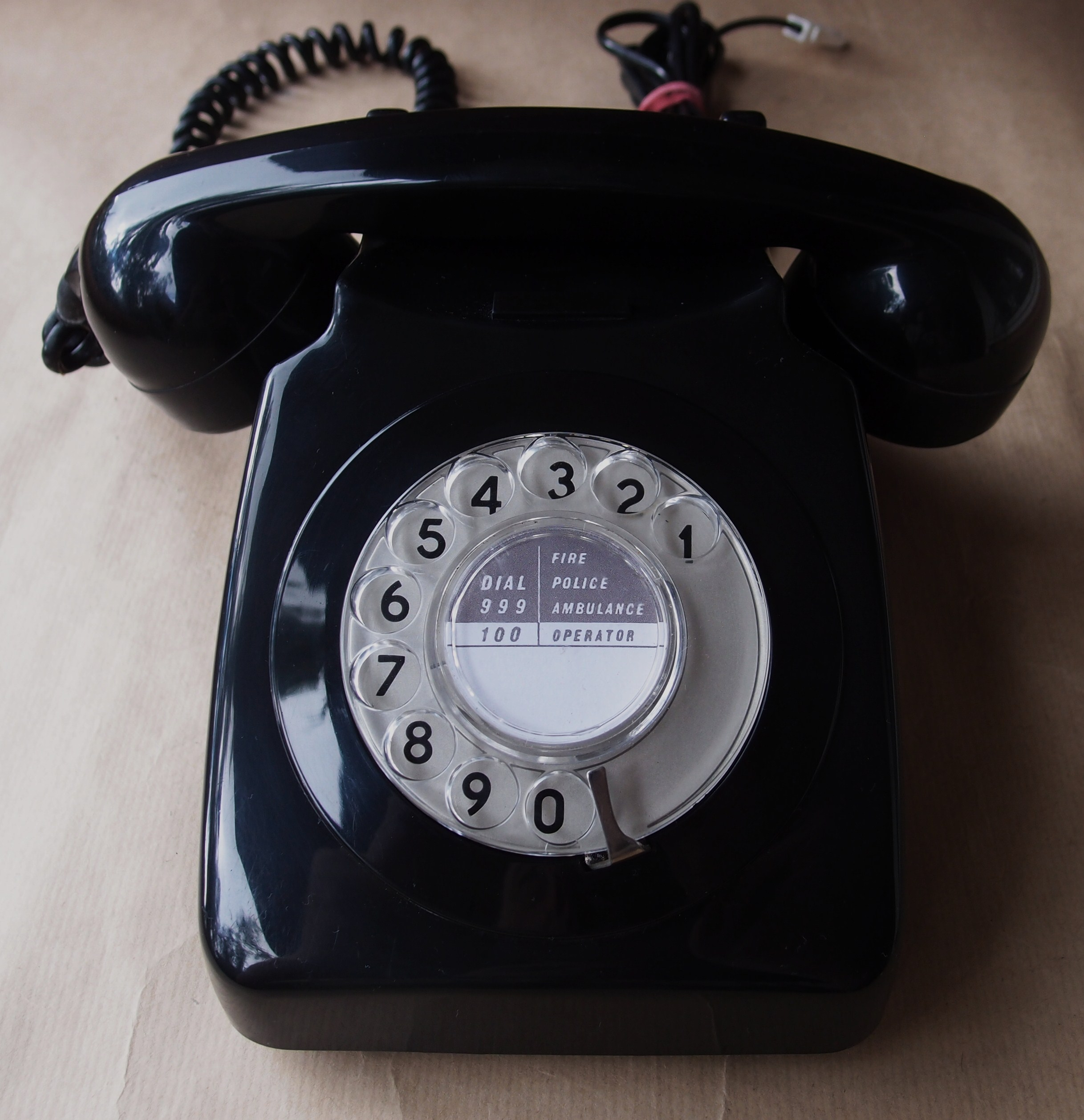
Black

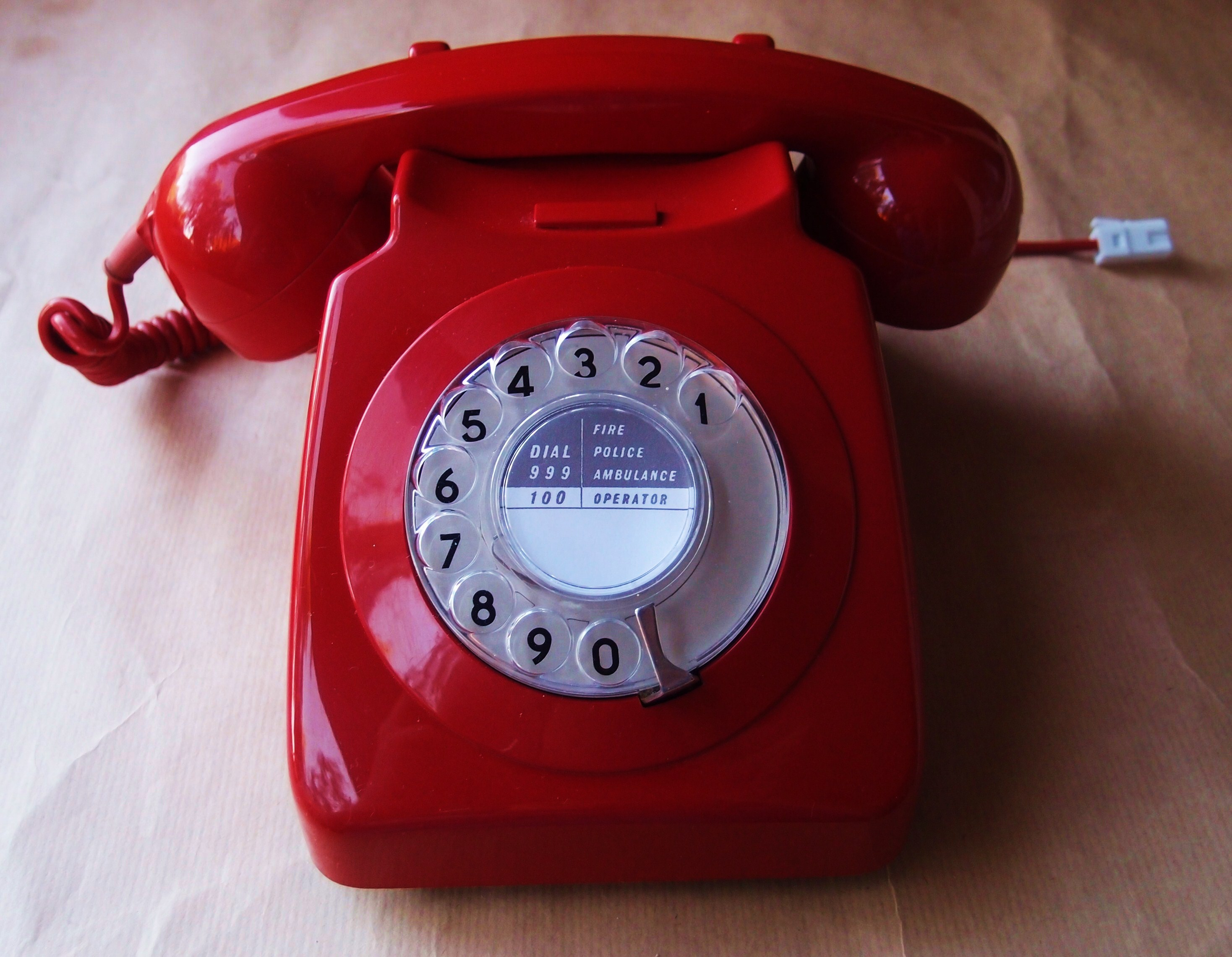
Red

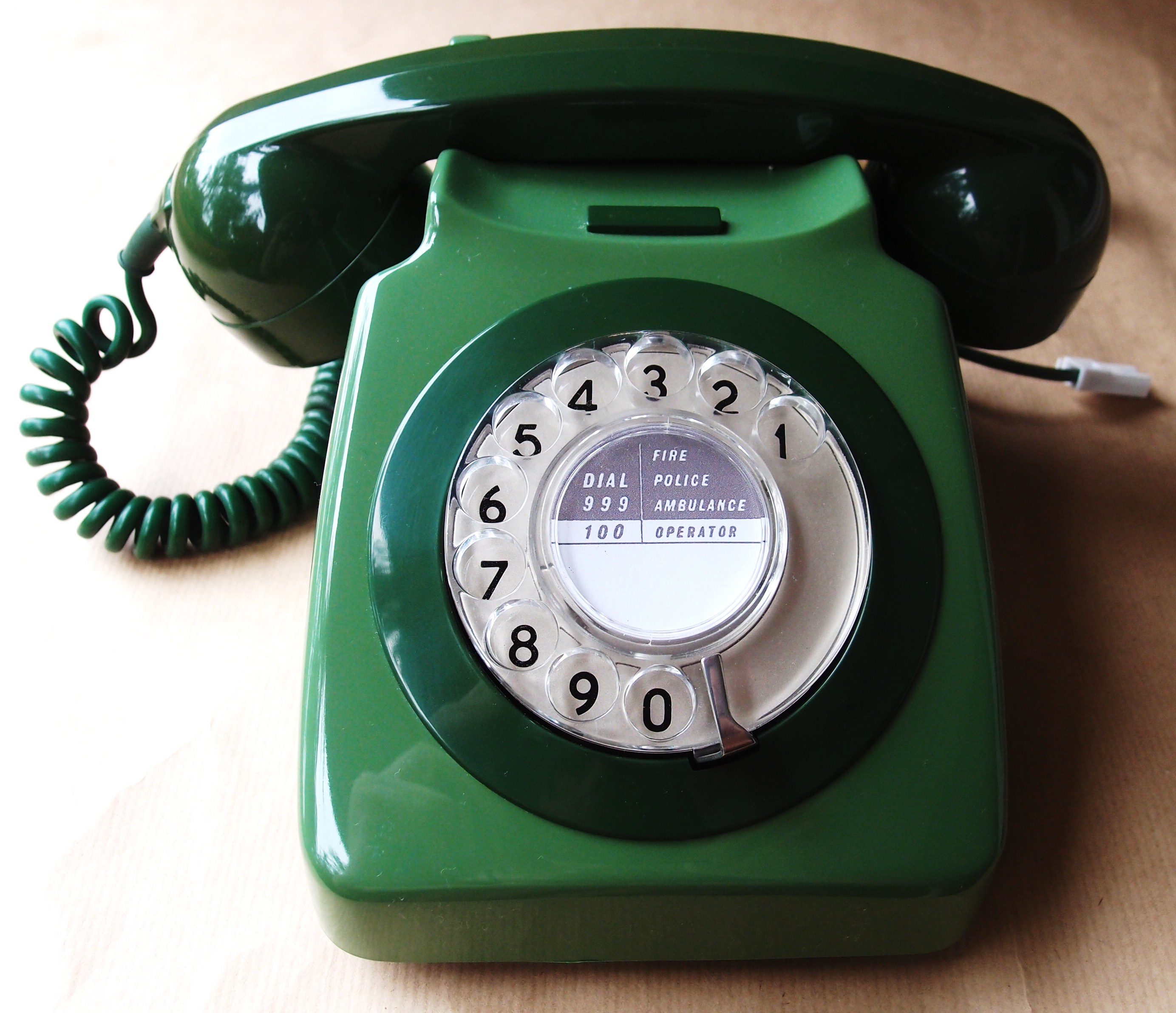
Two tone green

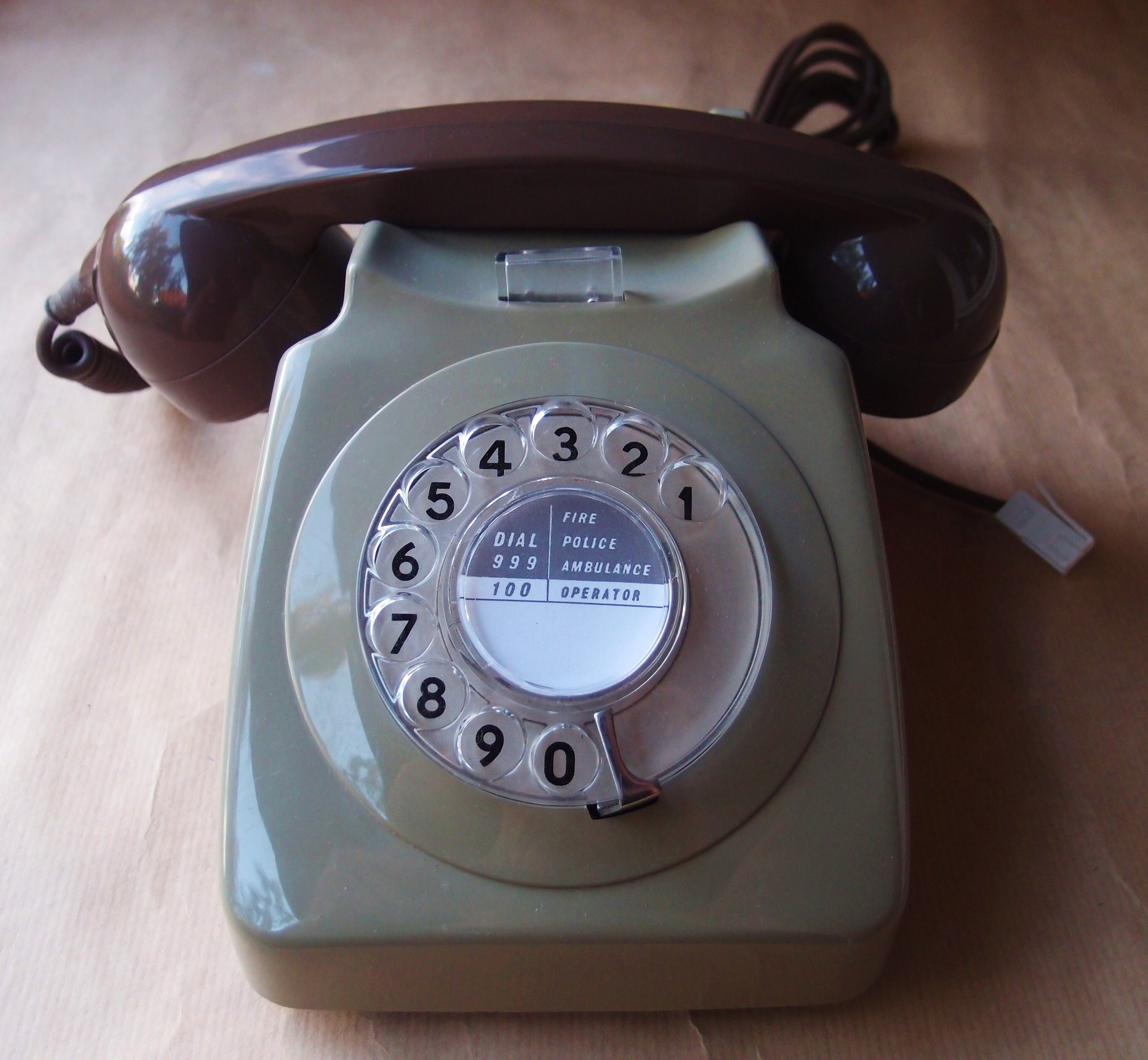
Two tone grey

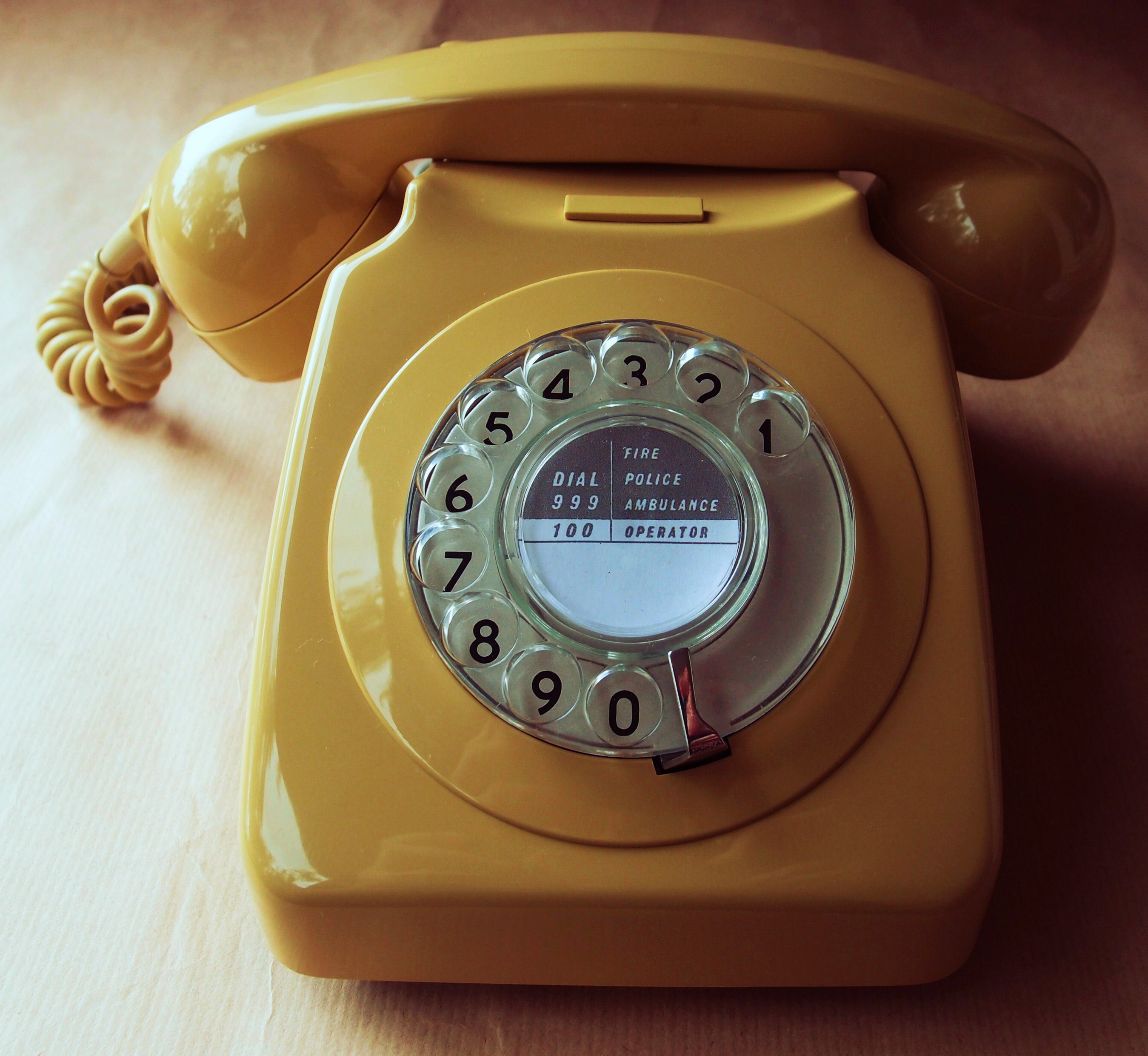
Topaz yellow

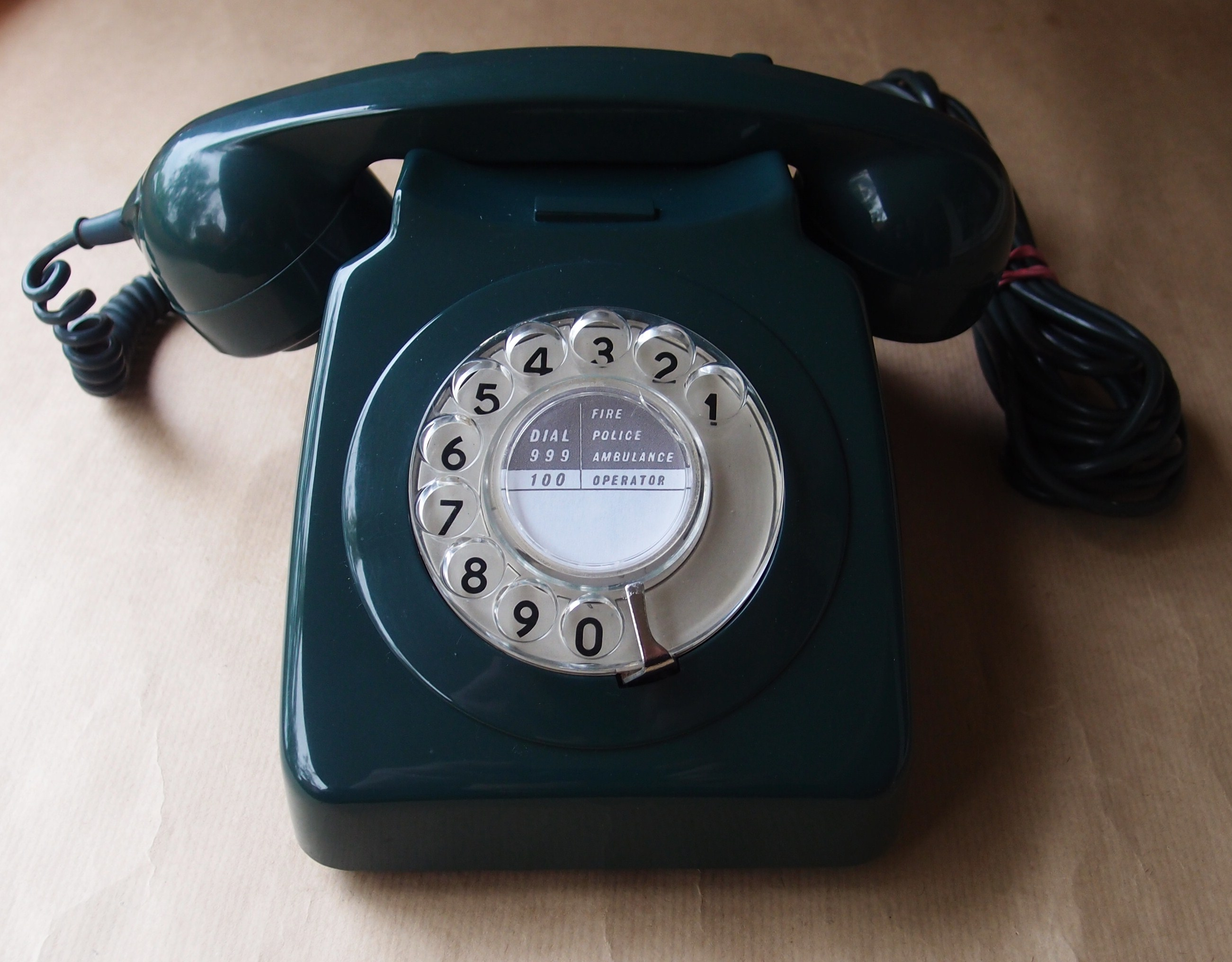
Concorde blue

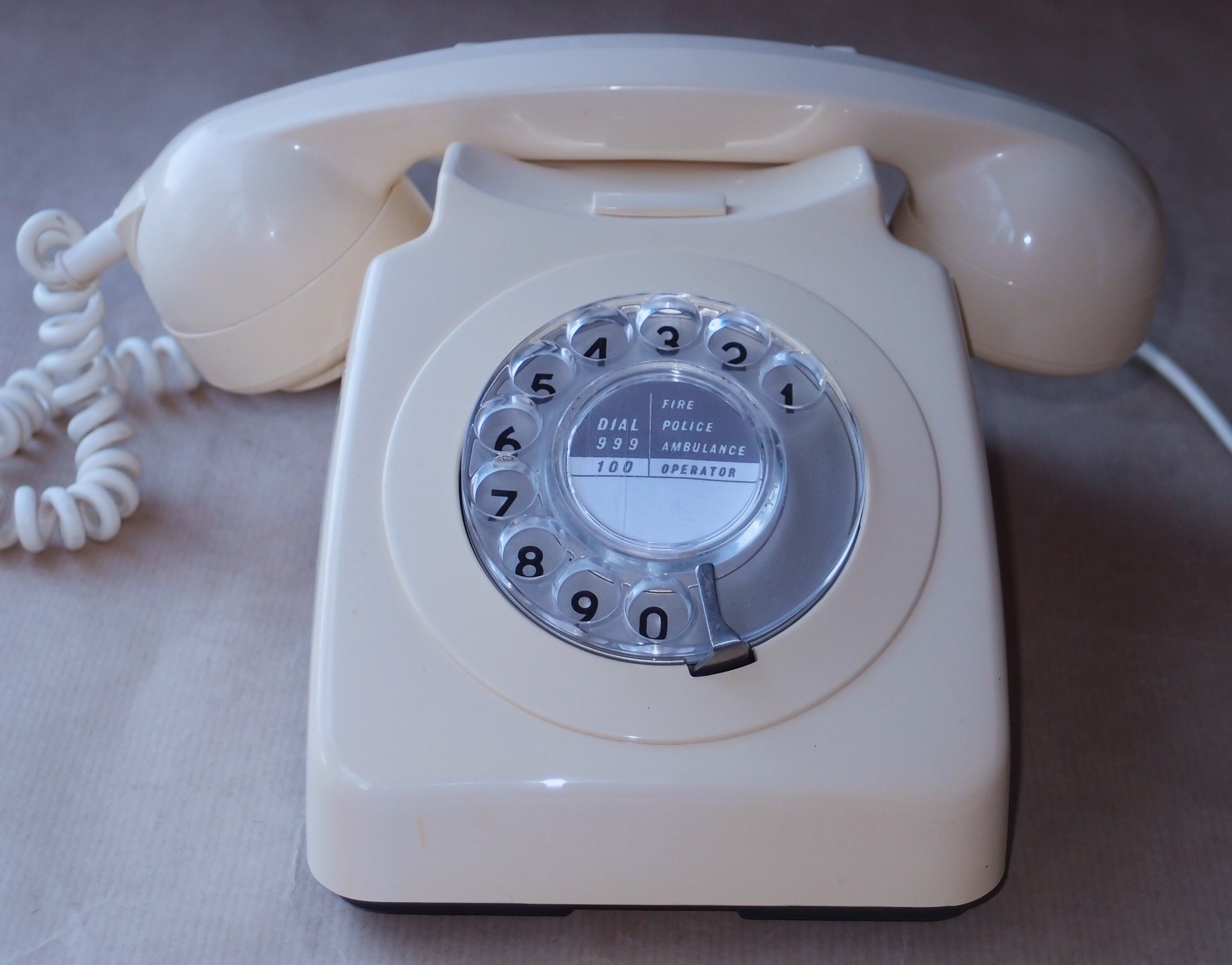
Ivory

In the 1980s a brown option was added known as The Yeoman.

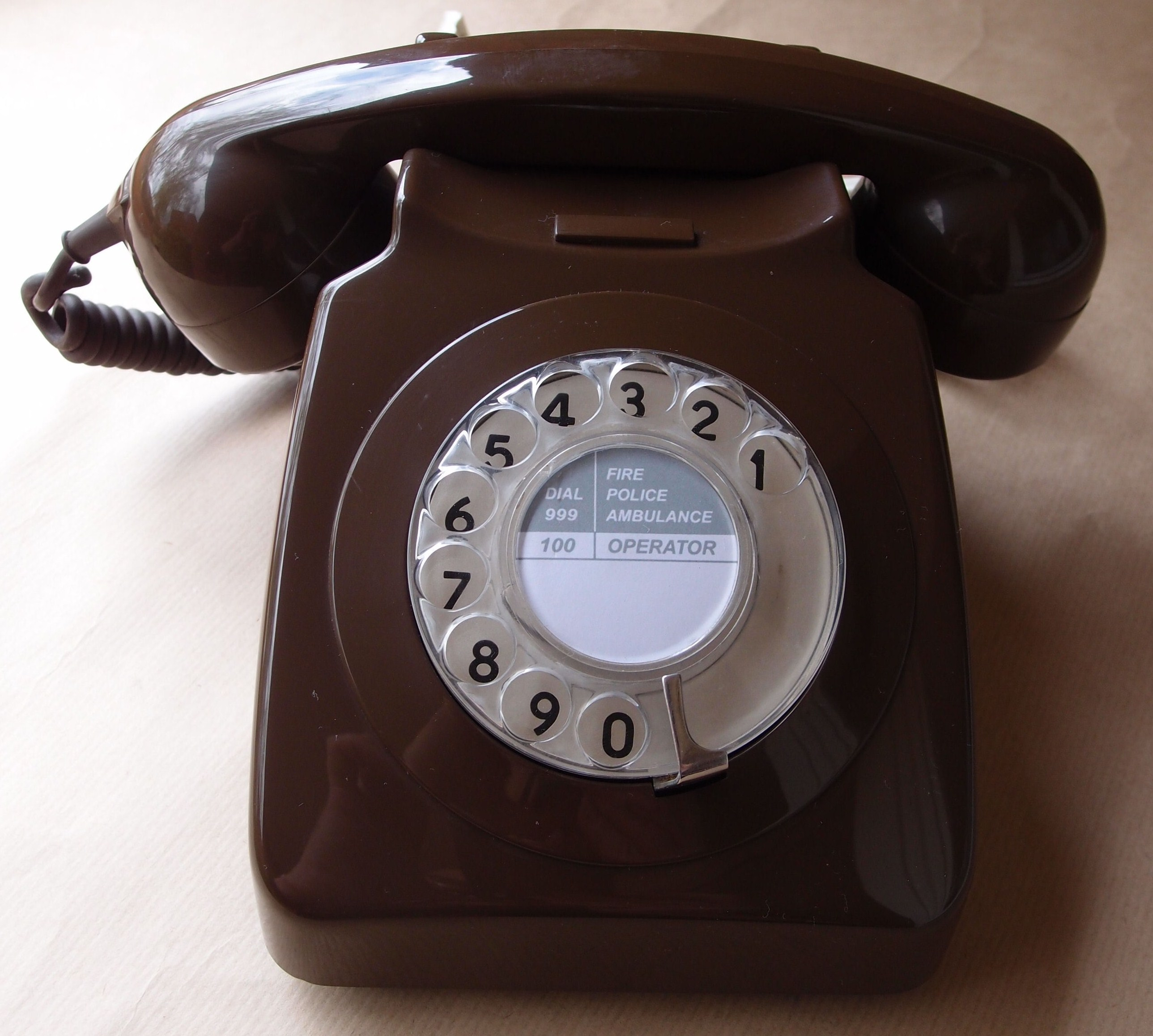
Brown

With modern exchanges the regulator is not required, but, although it can be removed from the 706, as shown below with the 746 the regulator is permanently wired in-circuit and cannot be removed.

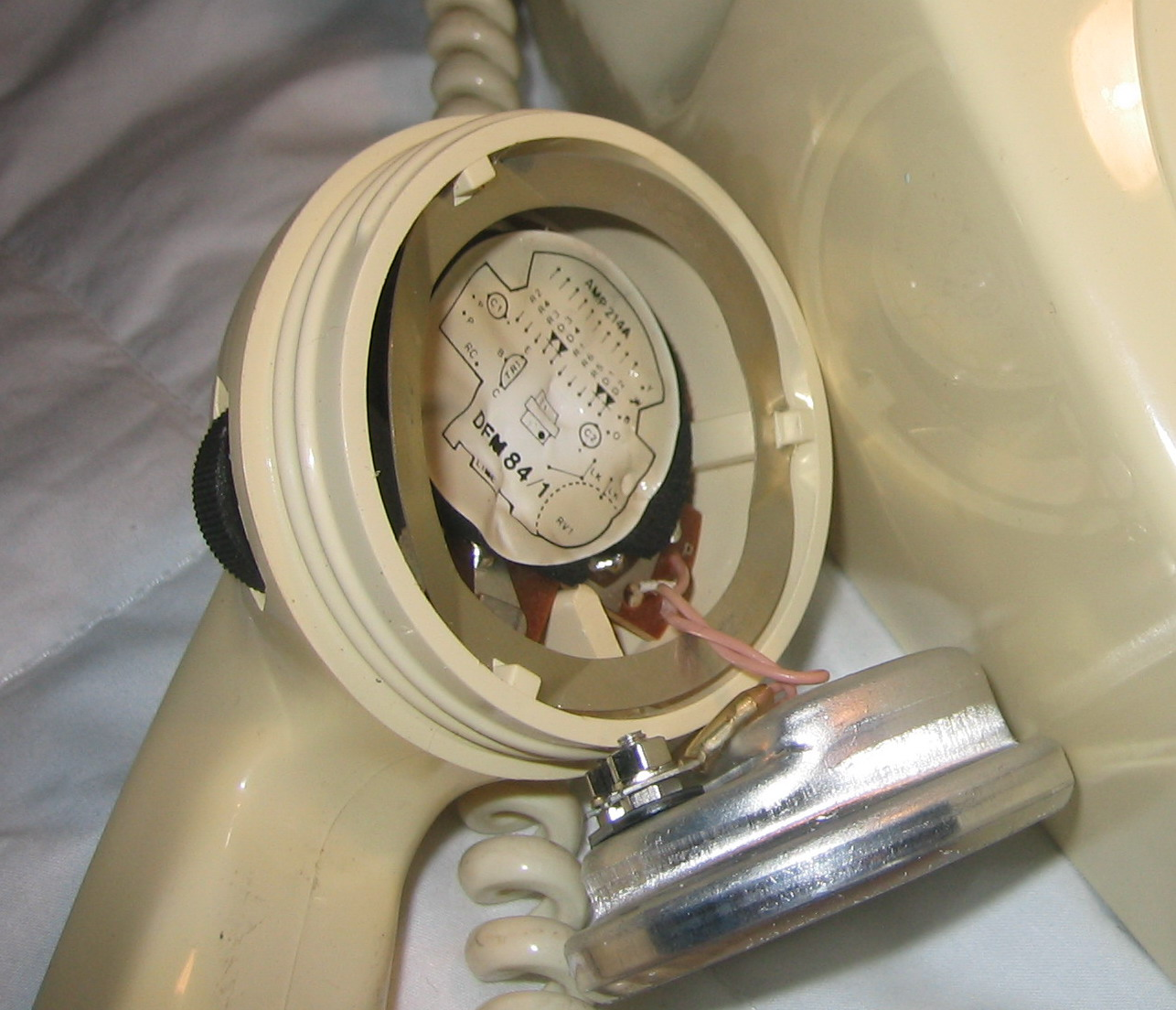
700 type, Amplifying Handset 214A, for the hearing impaired, with thumb-operated volume control on the side. Supplied as an optional extra for any 700-type instrument, this handset was also available with 'Lamp Signalling': a neon lamp, mounted in the top centre of the handle, flashed whenever the bell rang.

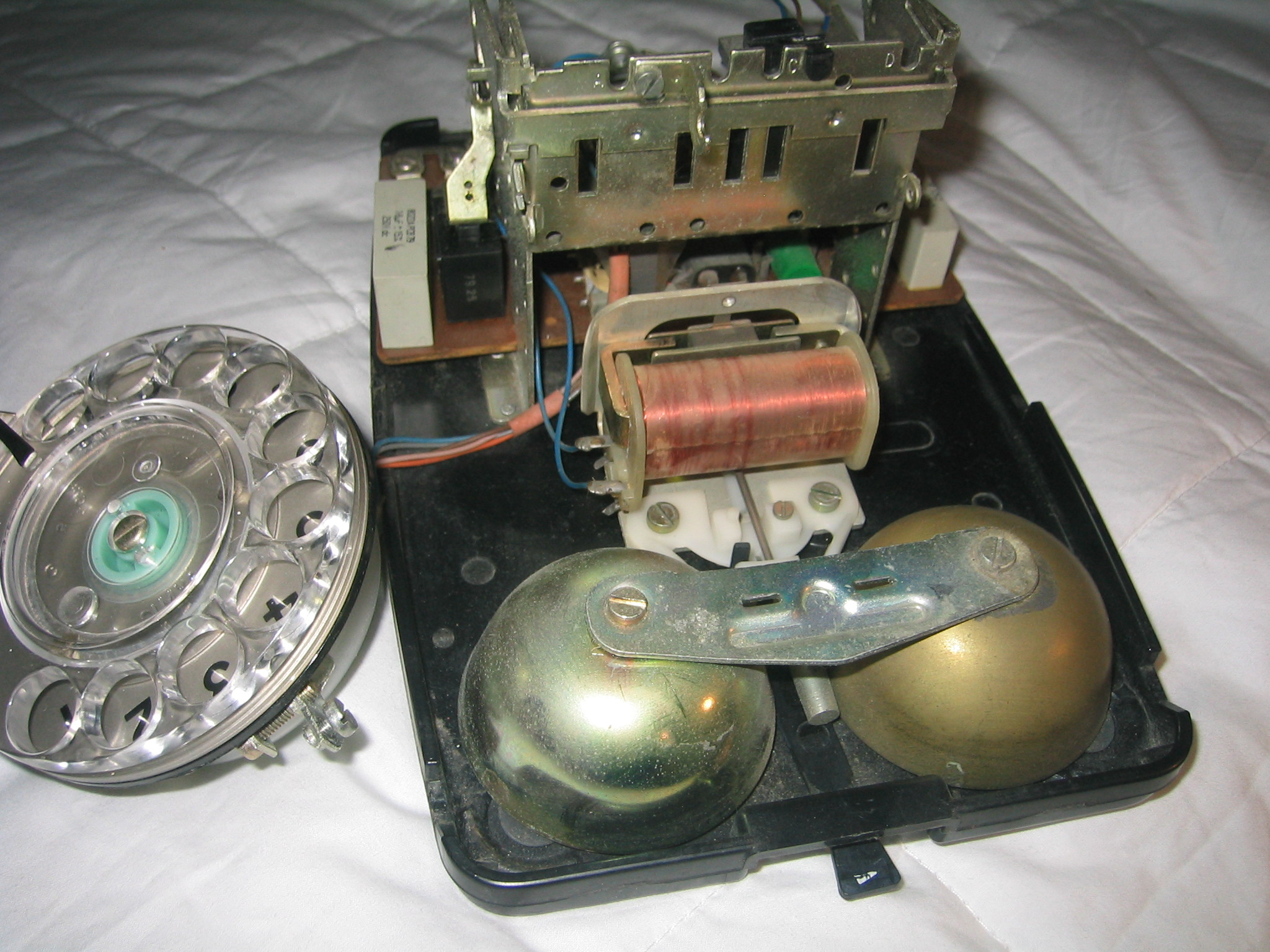
The lower cost Bell Type 79A used in the later 746 telephones. With the dial de-mounted, the chassis clearly shows the bracketry for fitting up to five locking or momentary-operated auxiliary switches. This feature was carried over from the Tele. 710.

The 700 series was able to have between one and six additional buttons fitted; these could be used for many purposes, of which the earliest was for seizing the line and getting Dial Tone for subscribers on Shared Service (party lines). The one shown in the picture was commonly used on bedside extensions, Plan 1A, to turn the bell on and off. If no button was required, the blank was left in place.

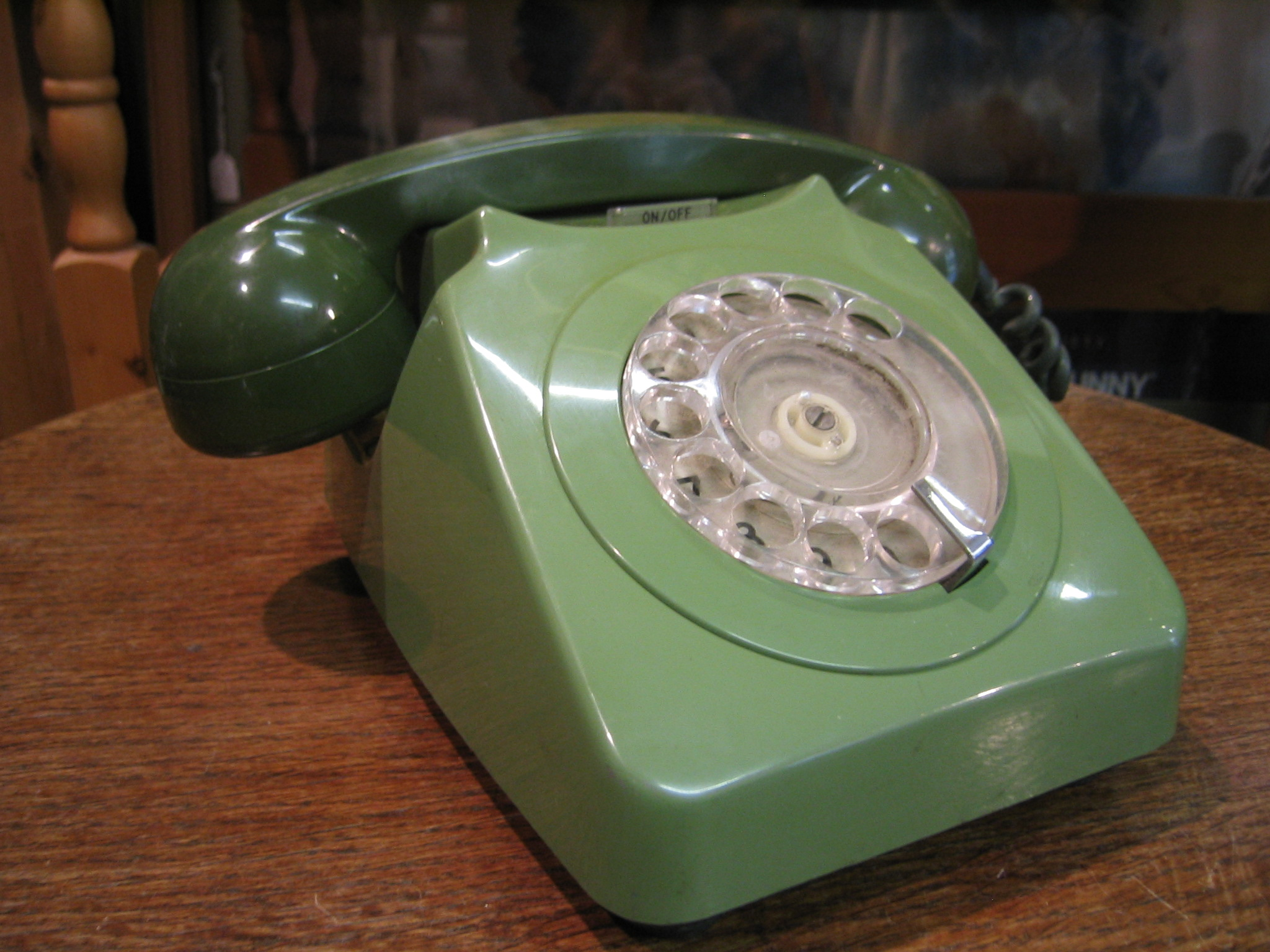
A very well used Tele. 746, manufactured in 1971, which spent its working life at a scrap merchants. Again an extension, with a bell on/bell off button. The main telephone may not have a switch as one bell must always remain in circuit.

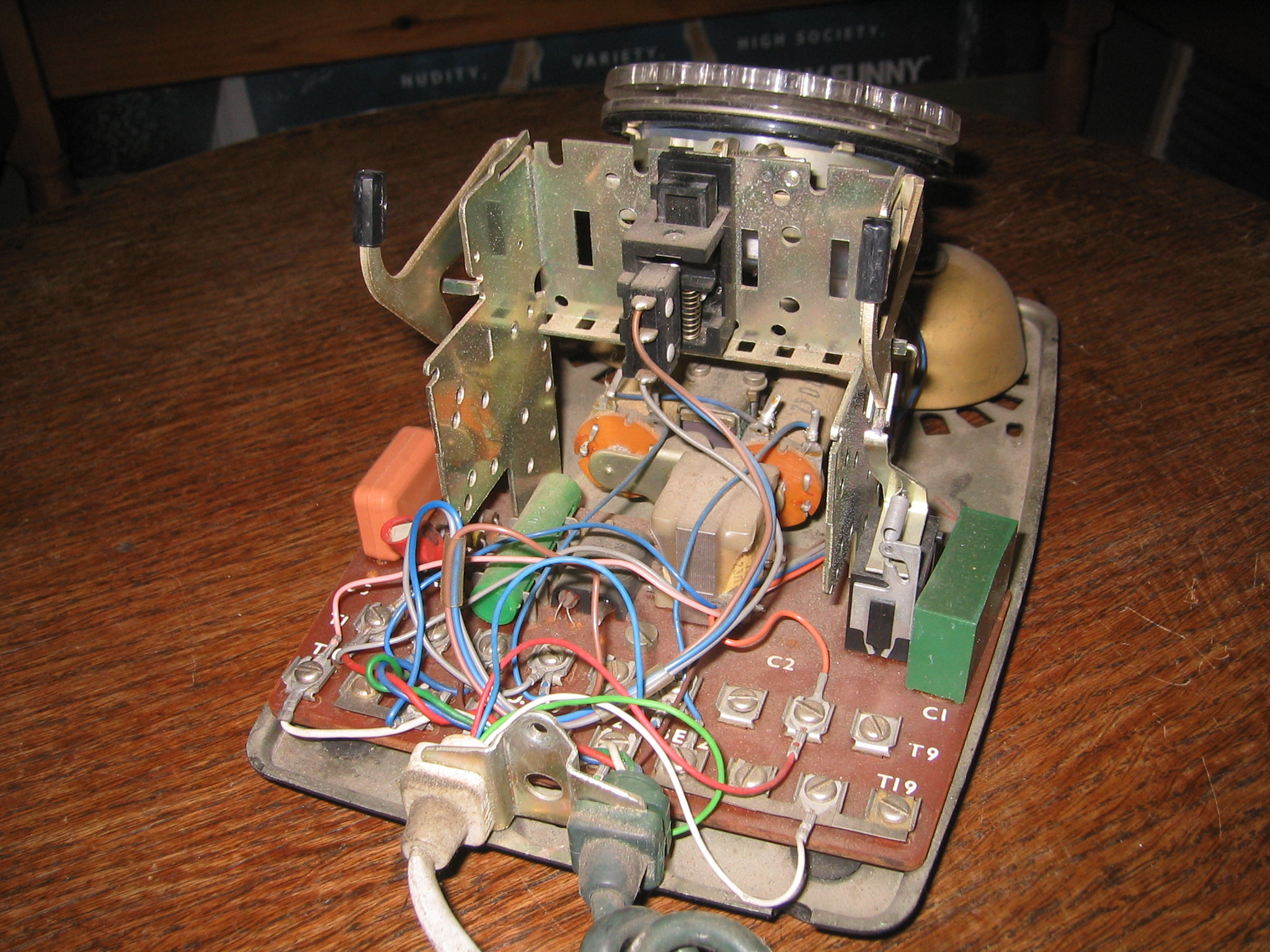
Inside the green 746L, showing the single switch, centrally mounted on the five way bracket.

The 746 style telephone was also produced for non GPO subscribers by many of the same manufacturers that produced telephones for the GPO. These telephones can be identified by having no "746" reference on the underside and will usually have the manufacturer's own reference instead.

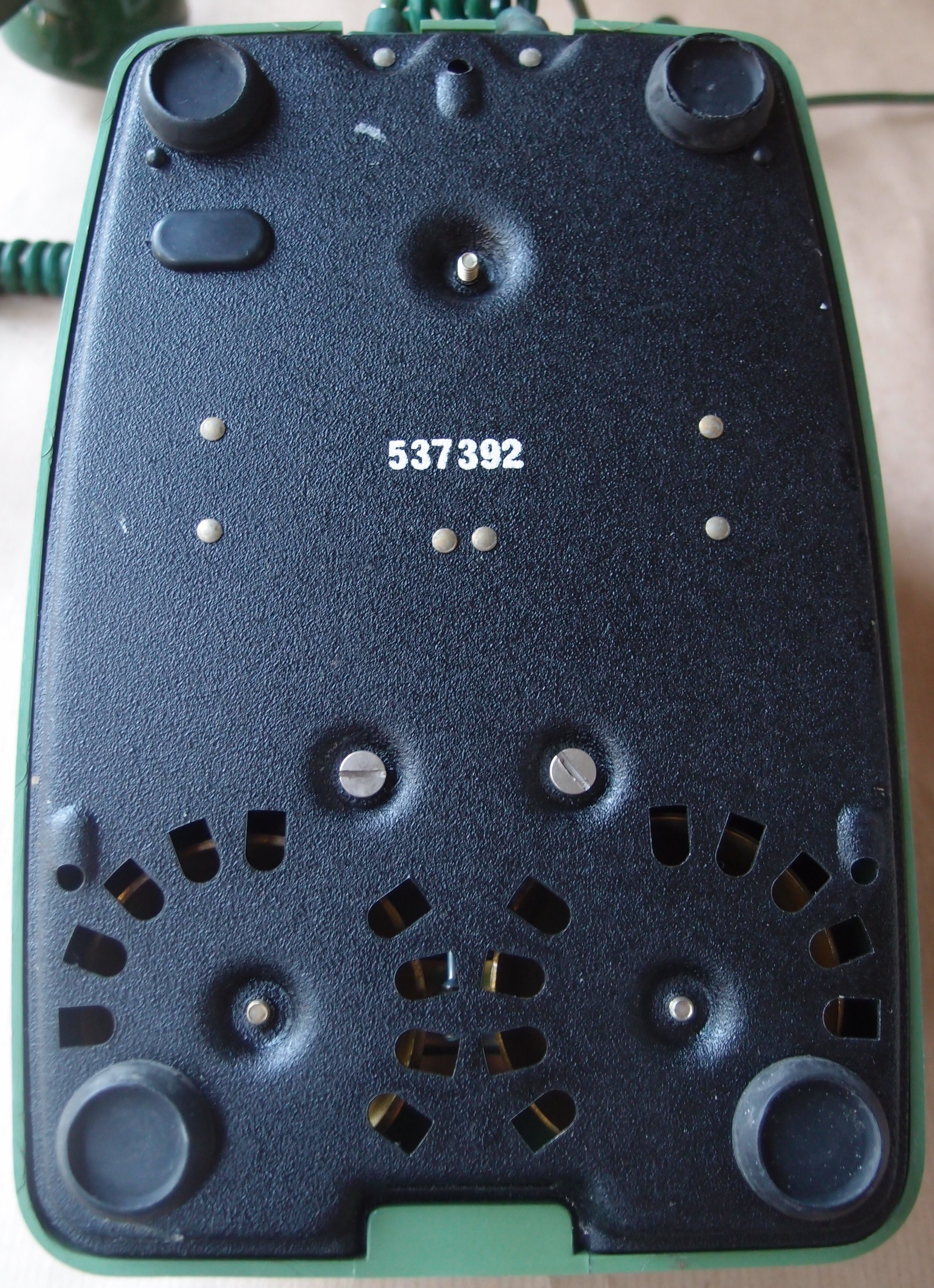
Underside of a 1971 TMC telephone showing the non standard manufacturer reference.

== Type 756 push button ==
Similar to the 746, but fitted with push buttons instead of a dial.

Just as the 700 type came about as a result of public demand. fuelled by US television shows, so the advent of 'Touchtone Dialling' in later American TV output brought about a demand for the same at home in the UK. Unfortunately the GPO did not yet have the exchange equipment necessary to support 'Touchtone' or DTMF (Dual Tone Multi-Frequency) as the GPO preferred to call it. So they decided to introduce a simulated version instead. This would comprise a very ordinary 700 type instrument, with a push button mod. kit fitted. Beneath the smart-looking buttons, a small converter circuit, powered by re-chargeable Ni-Cd cells, would convert the button presses back to perfectly normal, 10 impulse per second, loop-disconnect dial output, i.e. the new keypad was made to simulate an old rotary dial.

But this was the GPO, and nothing was ever that simple. Even though all the design research had already been done by the major US companies, The GPO decided to do it all over again. Although, initially, they decided to modify the existing 700-type instruments, what hadn't been decided was how the push-buttons should best be laid out. Completely ignoring the then-standard US layout, an experiment was put into motion at the Dollis Hill Research Centre. Mock-ups were made of every conceivable combination and layout of buttons. Each of these had its own seated operator and digital readout. All the button pads and readouts were cabled to a primitive computer. For weeks on end the computer flashed random series of numbers to the digital readouts and the operators had the task of punching these numbers, as quickly as possible, onto the keypads. The speed and accuracy rate were continuously logged, as was the ergonomic comfort of the operators. At the end of many months, much expense, and to absolutely no-one's surprise, the results came out in favour of the existing American layout! Sadly this was too late for at least one major company. ICI had decided to press ahead unilaterally with their own design, the Tele. 726, which had two rows of five buttons (no # or * buttons then) set horizontally across the centre of a circular face-plate. This proved very awkward to use.

This was the outcome of the trials. A perfectly normal Tele. 746, but fitted with push buttons instead of a dial and re-dubbed 756. The push buttons just created the same loop disconnect signalling pulses as a dial telephone, which caused horrendous post-dialling delay and much knuckle rapping frustration.

The model shown in the photograph is actually an 8756, which has been modified to enable it to be used with the 'New Plan' plug and socket system.

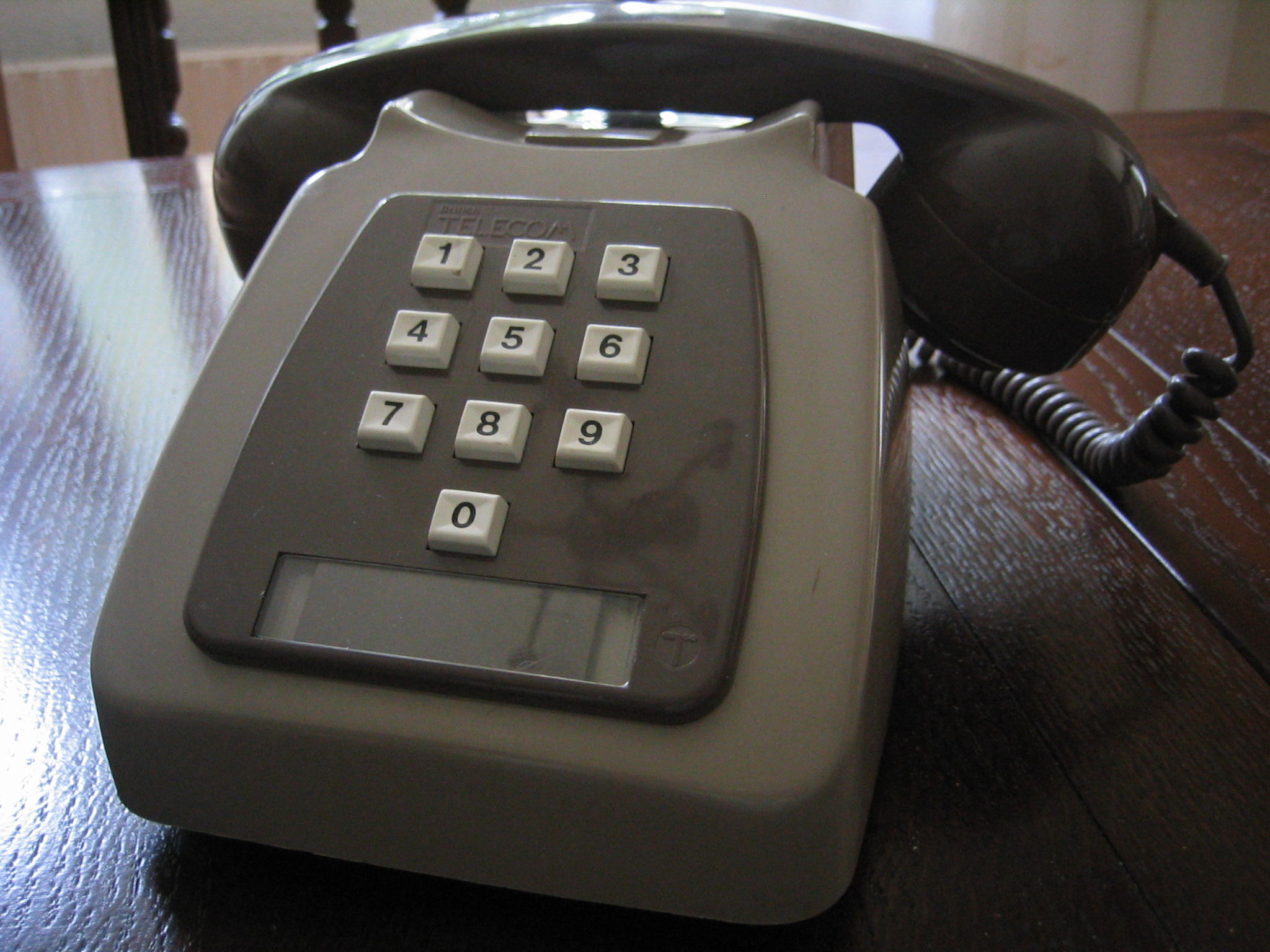
8756 Two Tone Grey Telephone

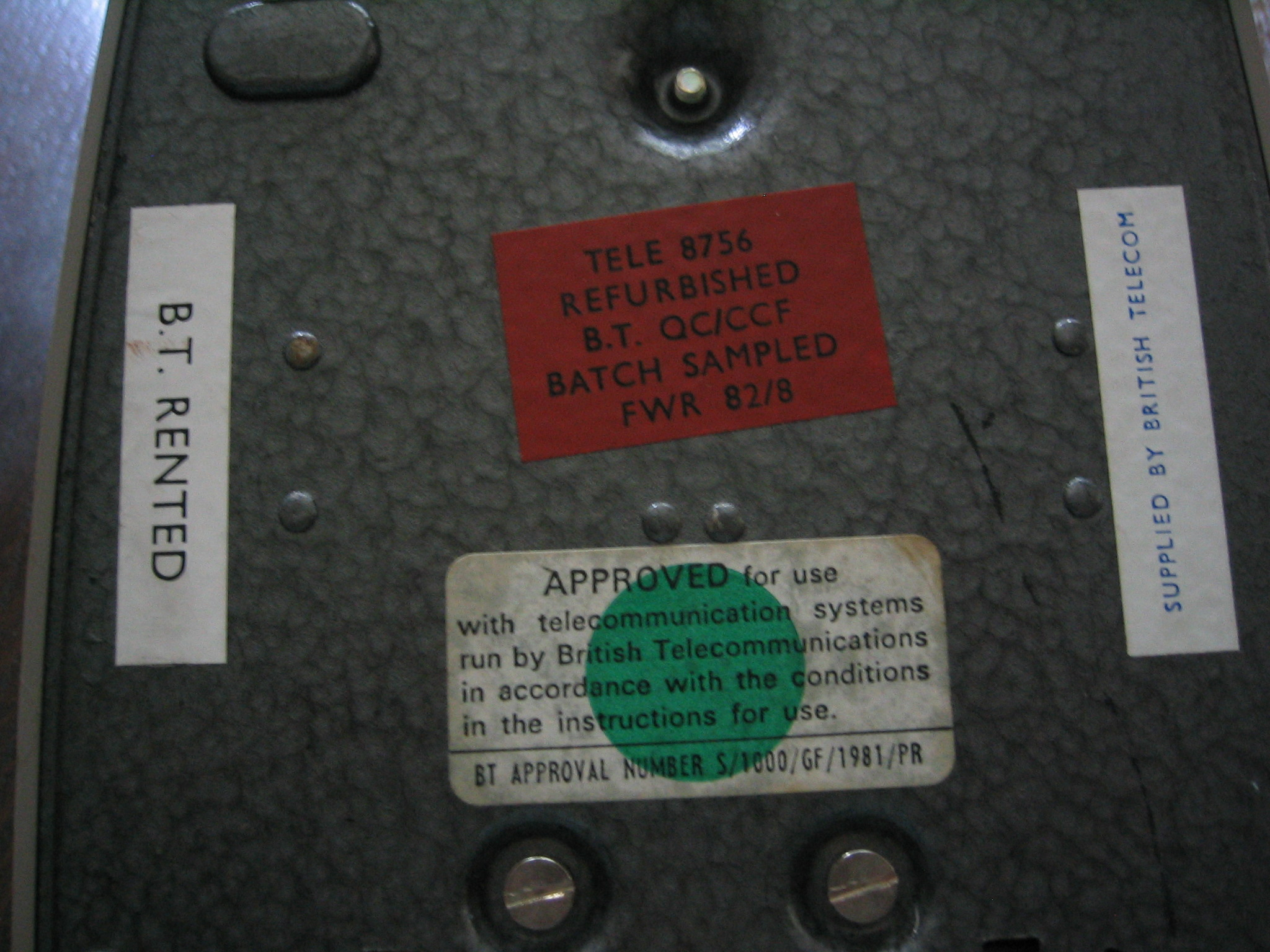
8756 Base, showing that this telephone was refurbished in 1982 and that this was a telephone rented from BT

== Type 766/8766 Push Button Trimphone ==
A loop dialling keypad version of the Trimphone was introduced in 1976 as the 766. The Trimphones were all fitted with a tone ringer which initially warbled quietly and then more loudly. With the advent of new style wiring the model numbers were prefixed with an '8' and were fitted with a 4000Ω high impedance ringer and a new style line cord fitted with a 431A plug. In 1982 the final incarnation of the Trimphone was relaunched with a new set of colours known as The Snowdon Collection.

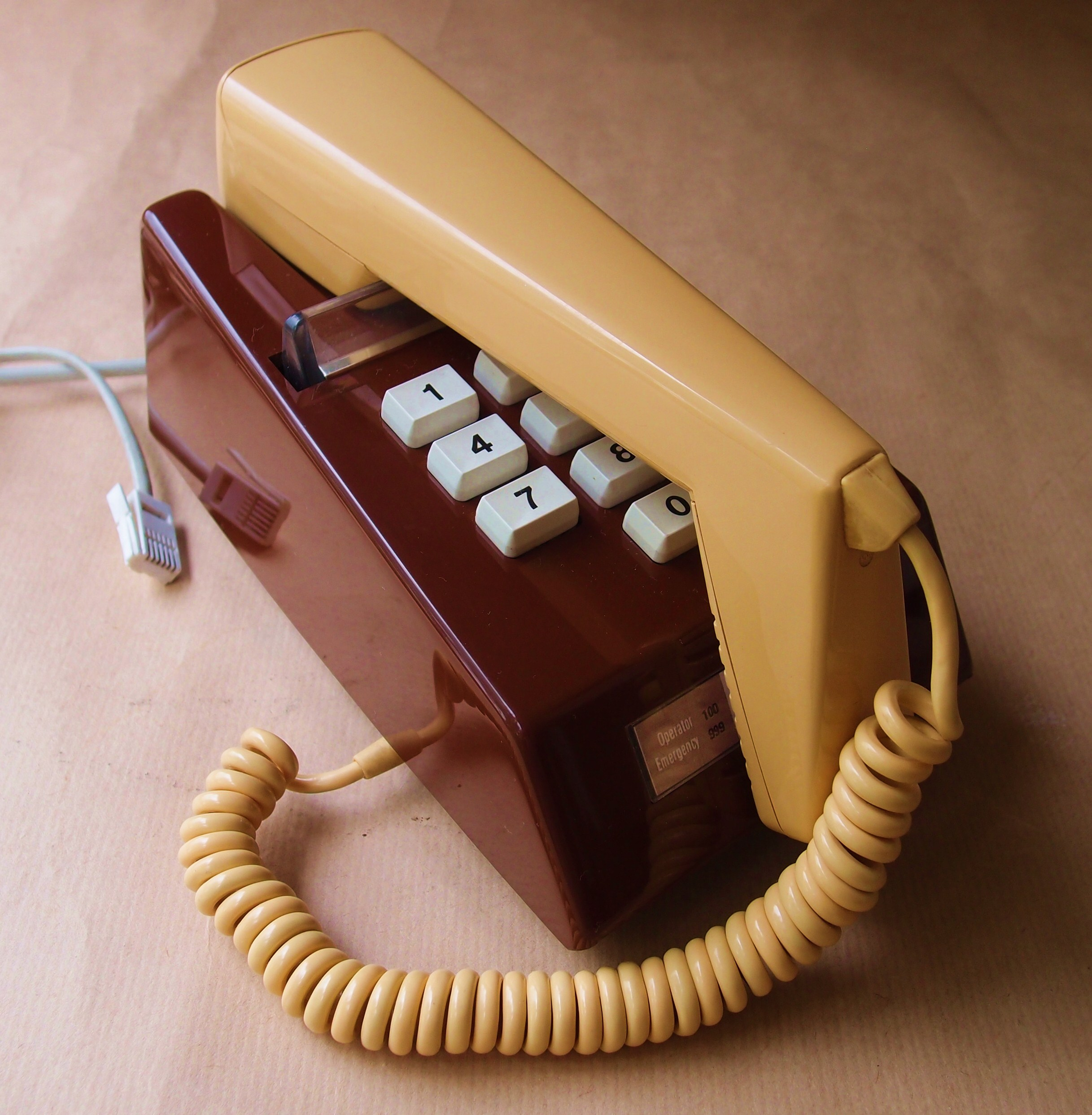
8766 Snowdon Collection Trimphone in brown and cream

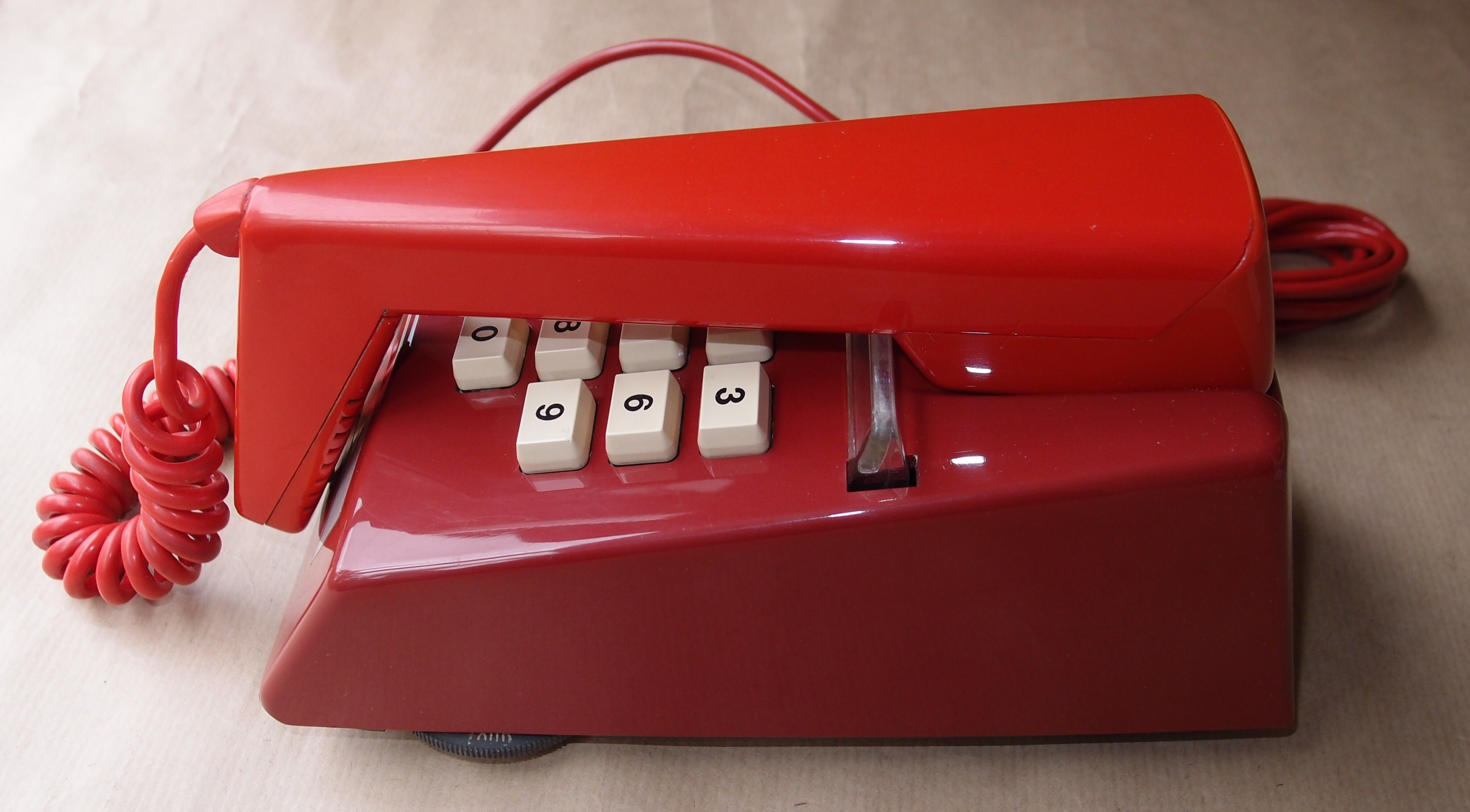
8766 Snowdon Collection Trimphone in two tone red

== Type 776 compact telephone ==
The 776 Compact Telephone was first introduced in 1977. Although based on the same circuitry as the 746 it was a smaller lightweight, space saving telephone and had a separate bell (bell unit 776) connected by a 3 metre extensible grey cord. An optional wall bracket (type 18A) for the bell unit was also available on which the telephone could stand.

The Compact was available in bright blue, light grey and mid-brown. The Silver Jubilee was released in 1977 to celebrate the Queen's Jubilee year. This was made in dark blue with a specially designed motif in the centre dial.

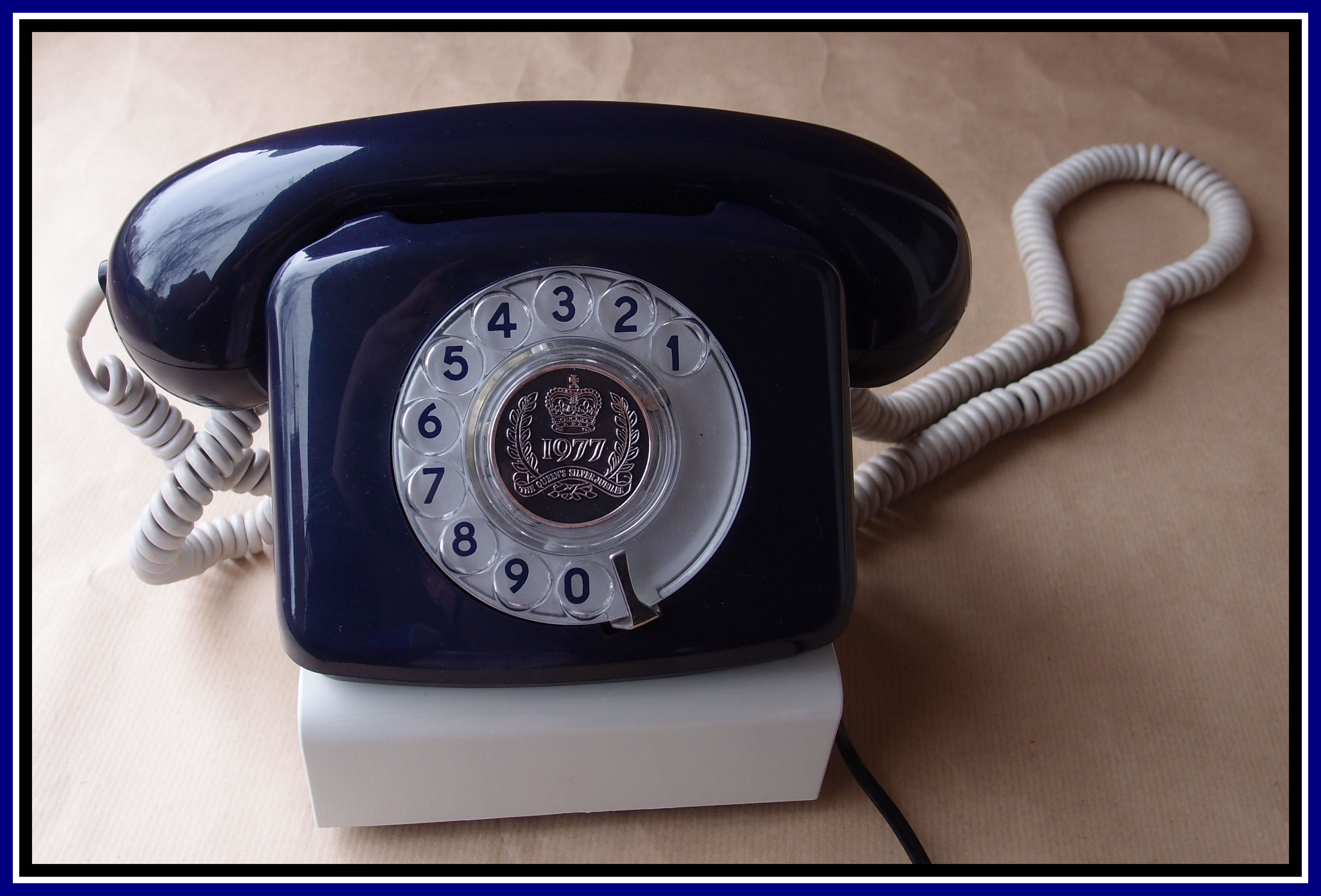
Special Edition Silver Jubilee 776 (SA4271) in the unique Balmoral blue colour.

== Type 782 Push Button ==
This was a 746 type telephone which could transmit MF4 signalling, also known as DTMF touch tones. These telephones could only operate to exchanges that could deal with MF4 but they were used on PABX systems that used MF4 for internal calls from the 1970s. The TXE1 exchange could handle MF4 calls as early as the late 1960s. This was however a unique prototype exchange, which served customers in Leighton Buzzard: otherwise customers did not have access to MF4 capable exchanges until later models of the TXE4 system came into service in the late 1980s.

== Plans 105 and 107 ==
These were updated versions of the 200 type plans 5 and 7 but based on the 700 type telephone. It had a master station which was a 700 type telephone mounted on a plinth with buttons, 'The Planset 625'. The master station and the extension stations could call and speak to each other and also handle and transfer outside calls. The difference between a Plan 105 and Plan 107 was that the latter had only one extension; the former had two. On plans with the 'A' suffix, conversation between the extension and the exchange was private against the planset. On a Plan 107 both of the long buttons, on the front of the Planset 625, were connected together. Pressing either would 'buzz' the single extension.

The Plansets were available in Black, Ivory and Grey, to match the three colours of telephone officially specified. However, many customers opted for contrasting case, planset and handset colours.

As with the HES3, the installing engineer would have to requisition all the elements separately and assemble them on-site, from an array of packaging. With its case removed, the master instrument was then screwed down onto the Planset whilst squeezing a thick umbilical cable up through the oblong hole in the telephone baseplate. This was very difficult to achieve without damage to the wiring. The hole left in the rear of the telephone case, by the removal of the, redundant, instrument cord, now had to be filled with a matching coloured, square bung.

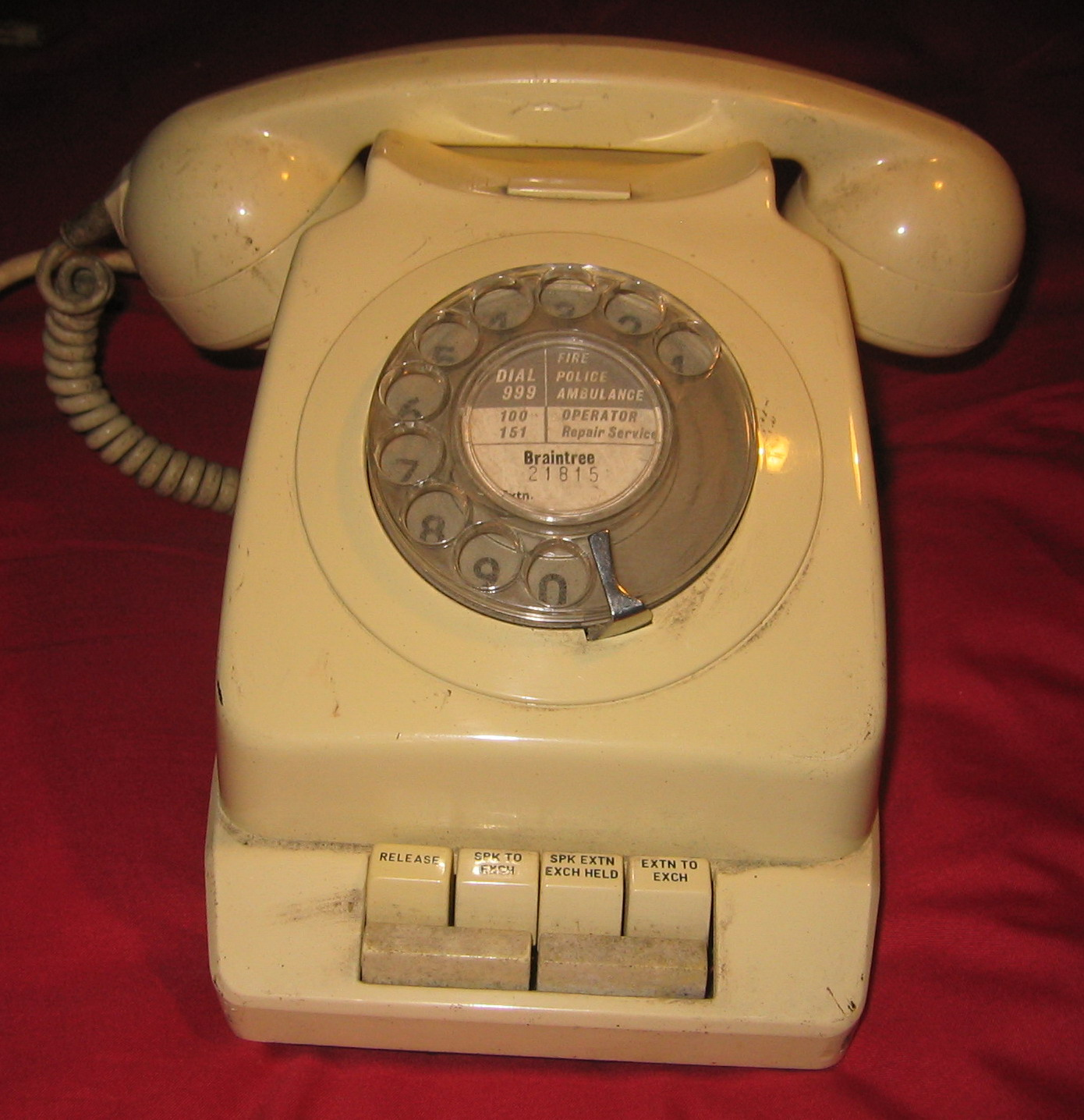
A well used Plan 105 master station

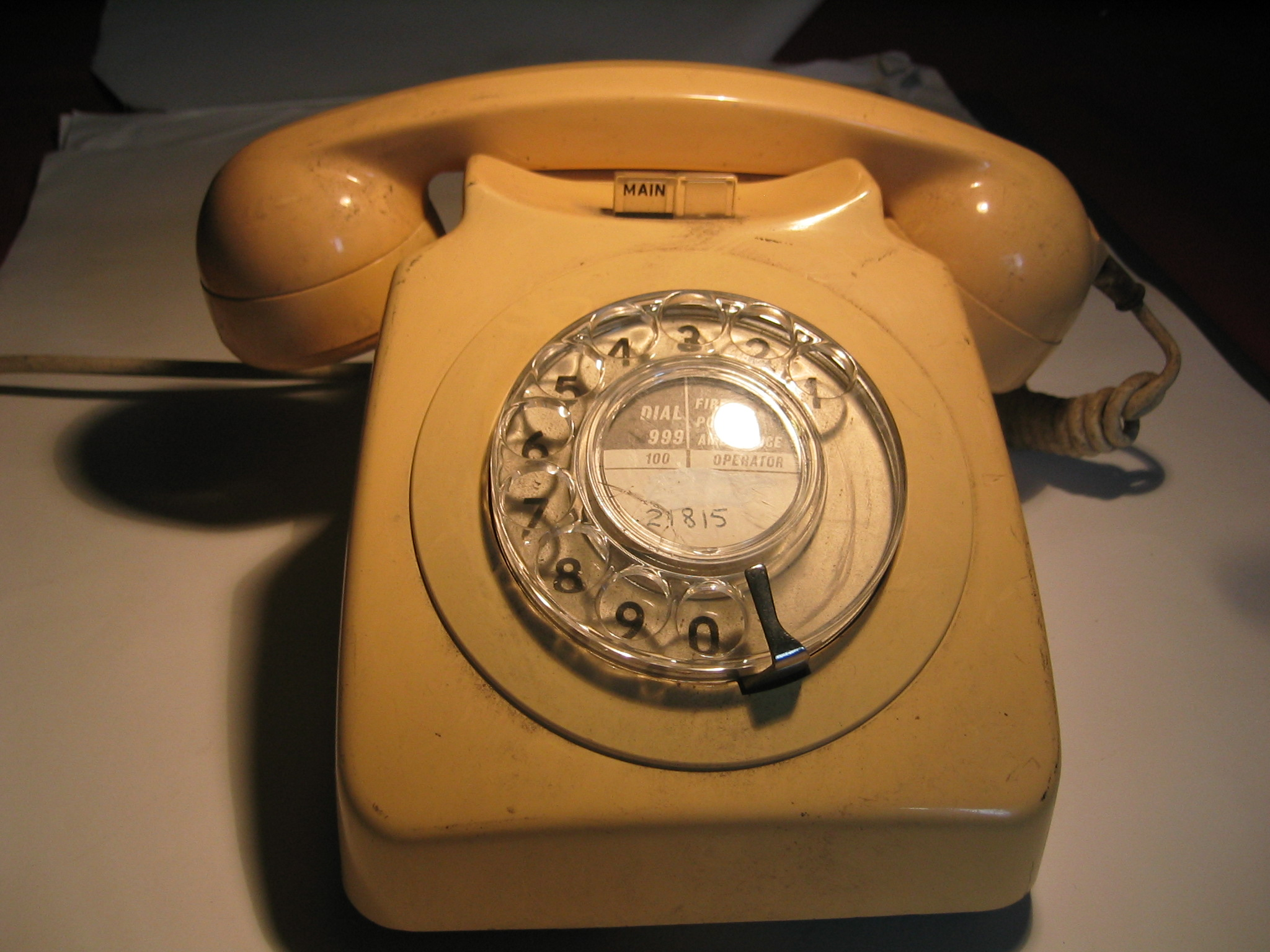
A Plan 105 extension showing the call button

== House Telephone System 2 and HES 4 ==
These were 700 type updates on the HTS 1 and HES 1 respectively. On both systems the main improvement over their predecessors was that the rows of call buttons were now arranged transversely instead of longitudinally. This meant that the basic 706 case styling only needed to be stretched forwards by 3 inches instead of 8 as previously, on the HES. This looked neater and took up less space. Otherwise, both of these systems had the same facilities as their 300 type counterparts.

== Statesman and Tremolo ==
The GPO (later BT) began to supply the public with a far greater range of stylish telephone instruments. With the advent of 'New Plan' sockets and changes in legislation, subscribers were now free to either rent their telephone or purchase one from any source (as long as it was an approved model).

These similar telephones were initially only loop disconnect types, when introduced in the early 1980s, but were later available in MF4 (touchtone) versions. They were among the first range of BT phones to be available for outright sale. A novel feature of these phones was that both the dialing circuit and the transmission circuit were on a single microchip. The one shown in the photograph is a 9003R manufactured in January 1984 and is loop disconnect. The Tremolo has squarer, flatter styling with a handle recess in the case, below the handset, by which it may be carried in use.

An unwelcome side-effect of the modern lightweight materials used on these and all later models was that the handsets were too light. Not only did they not reliably hold down the tiny micro-switch, which now served as the switchhook, but users did not like the feel of them. They felt like 'toys'. They lacked 'gravitas'. This was addressed by the simple inclusion of a steel bar in the handle of the handset to give it weight and make it feel a 'serious' piece of equipment. The telephones could be desk or wall mounted without any modification.

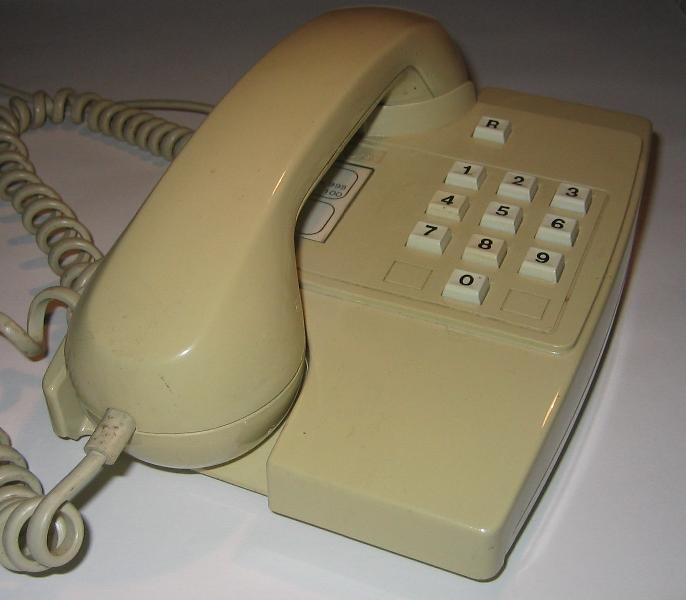
GPO Statesman 1984 Ivory

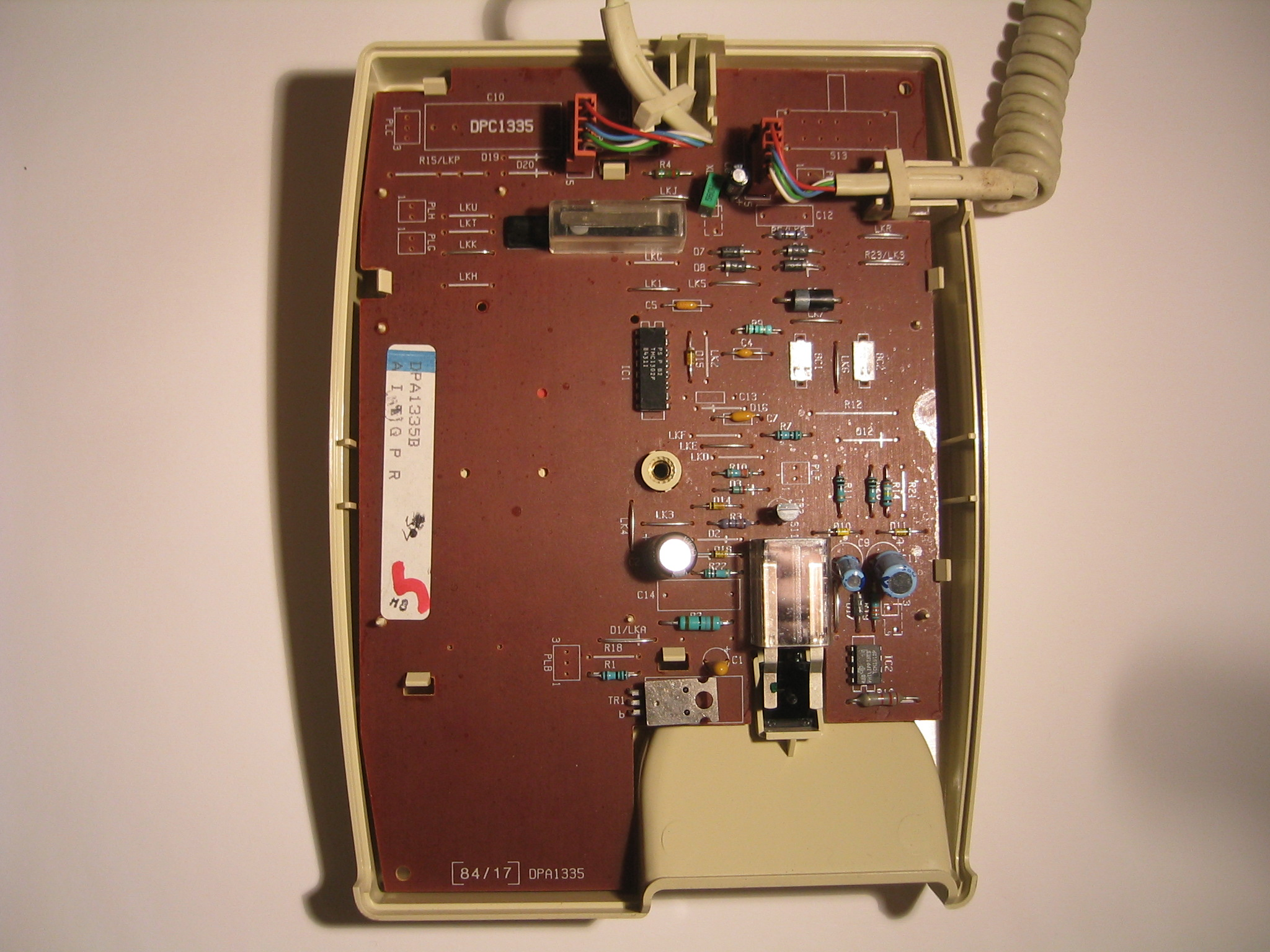
GPO Statesman 1984 Ivory Inside. Notice the lack of components as compared with the 700 series. It's all in the chip.

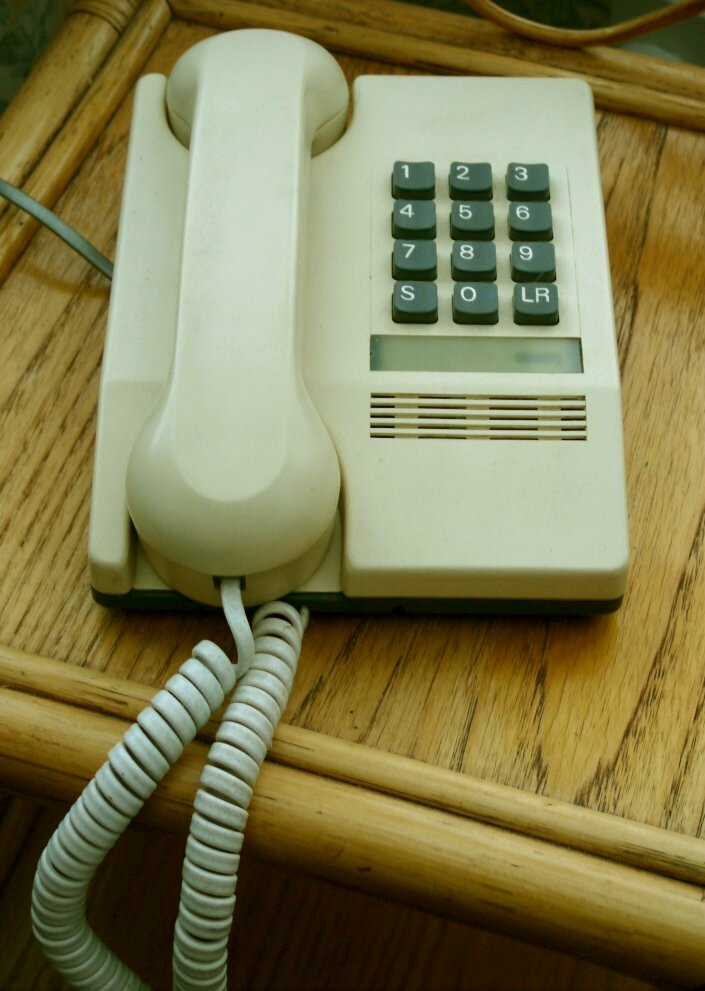
BT Tremolo, Ivory

== Tribune ==
This telephone was able to operate on both loop disconnect (pulse) and MF4 (tone) dialing. The method was chosen by a switch on the base, as shown in the photograph. It was introduced in the 1980s as a basic telephone and was the last model with a mechanical bell. The volume control was the ultimate in simplicity: a plastic disc with a hole in it which could be rotated to cover over the sounder holes by a varying amount.

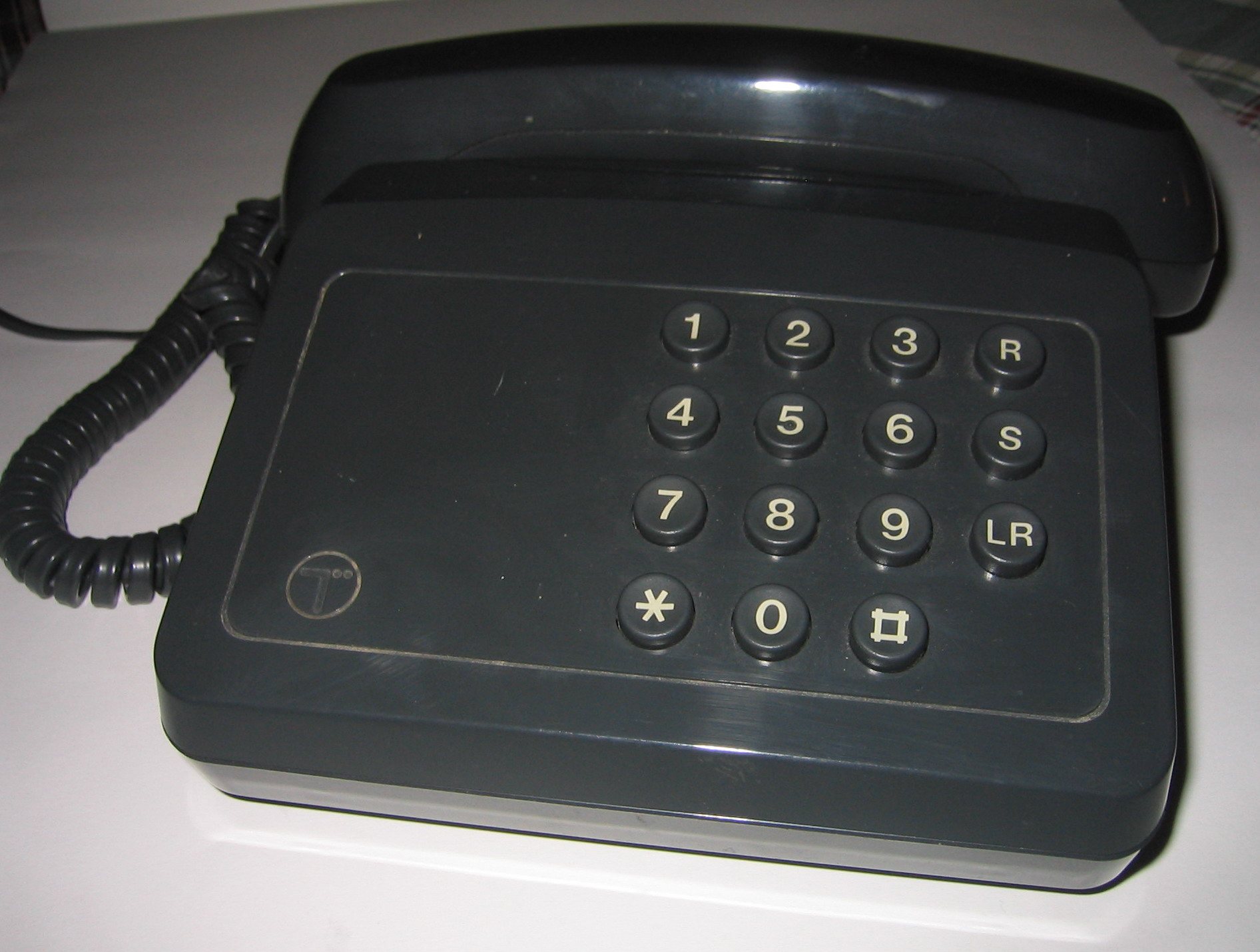
GPO Tribune Blue

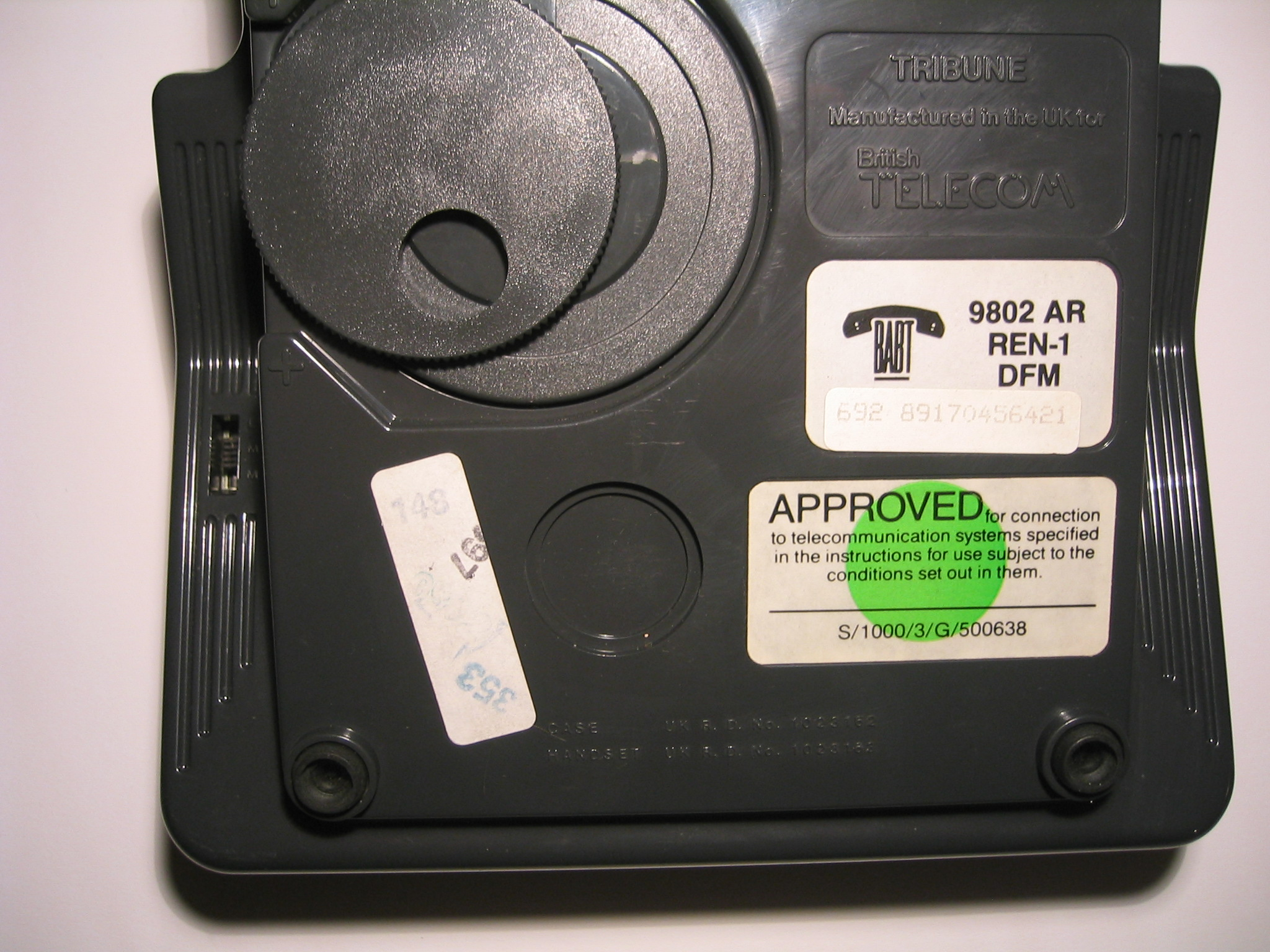
GPO Tribune Blue base. A switch on the left hand side changes from Loop Disconnect to MF4. Also shows the wheel which is a crude method of adjusting the ringing volume

== Relate and React ==
These telephones are able to operate on both loop-disconnect (pulse) and MF4 (tone) and a switch on the base of the telephone chooses the method. The volume of the ringer could also be changed to High, Low or Off ('off' did not actually disconnect the bell but merely locked the clapper in position so that it could not strike the bells). The Relate is shown on the left, the React has a squarer styling, without the pen-holder tray. On the underside of the Relate there is a mount that can be fitted in two positions. One makes it a desk telephone and mounting it the other way round turns it into a wall telephone – very ingenious. On the React, the only modification required, for wall mounting, is the reversal of a tiny tab, in the receiver recess. This prevents the handset falling on the floor. A similar tab is molded onto the top of the case, to provide an 'Off Hook' parking position.

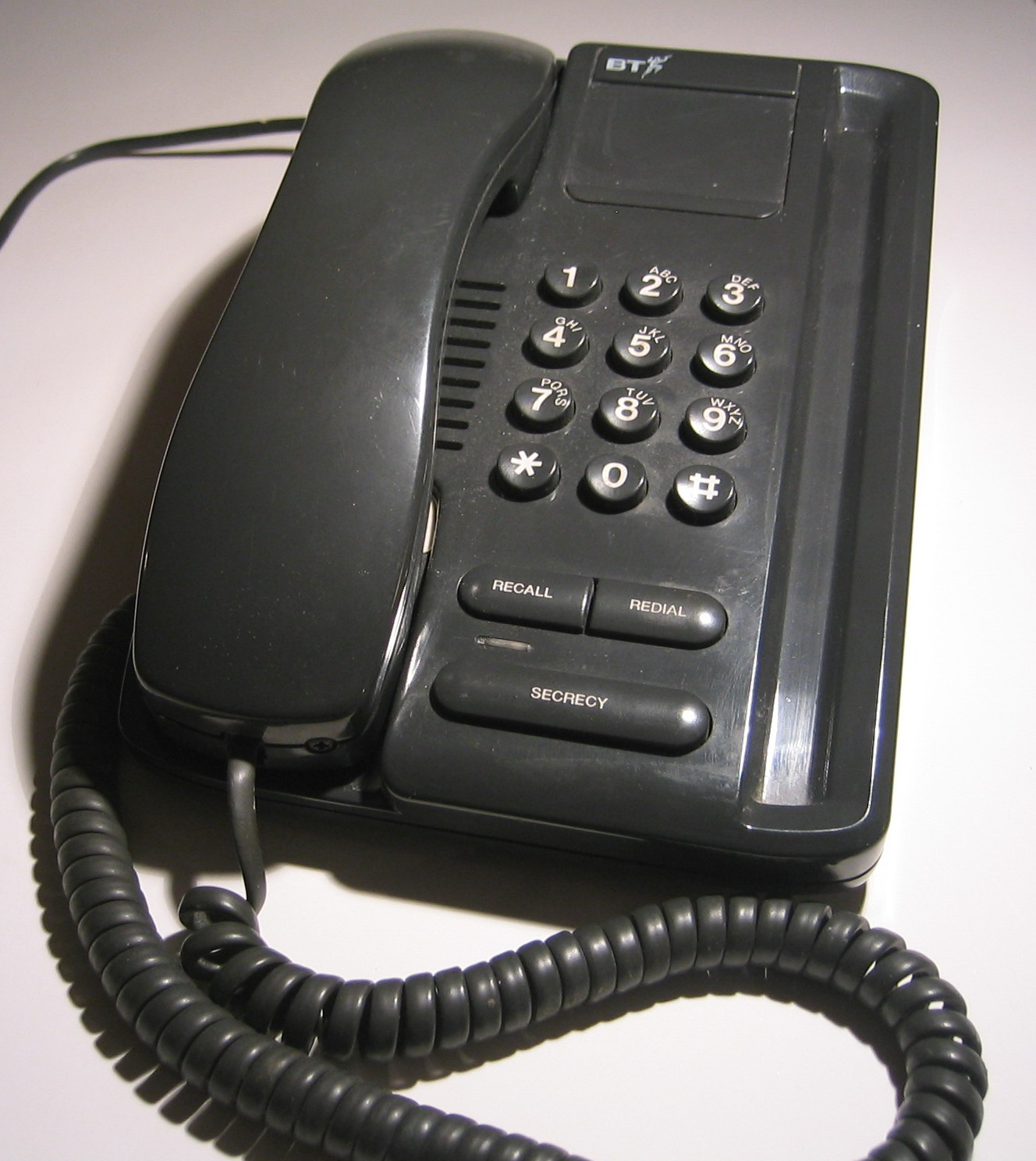
GPO Relate 100 Blue

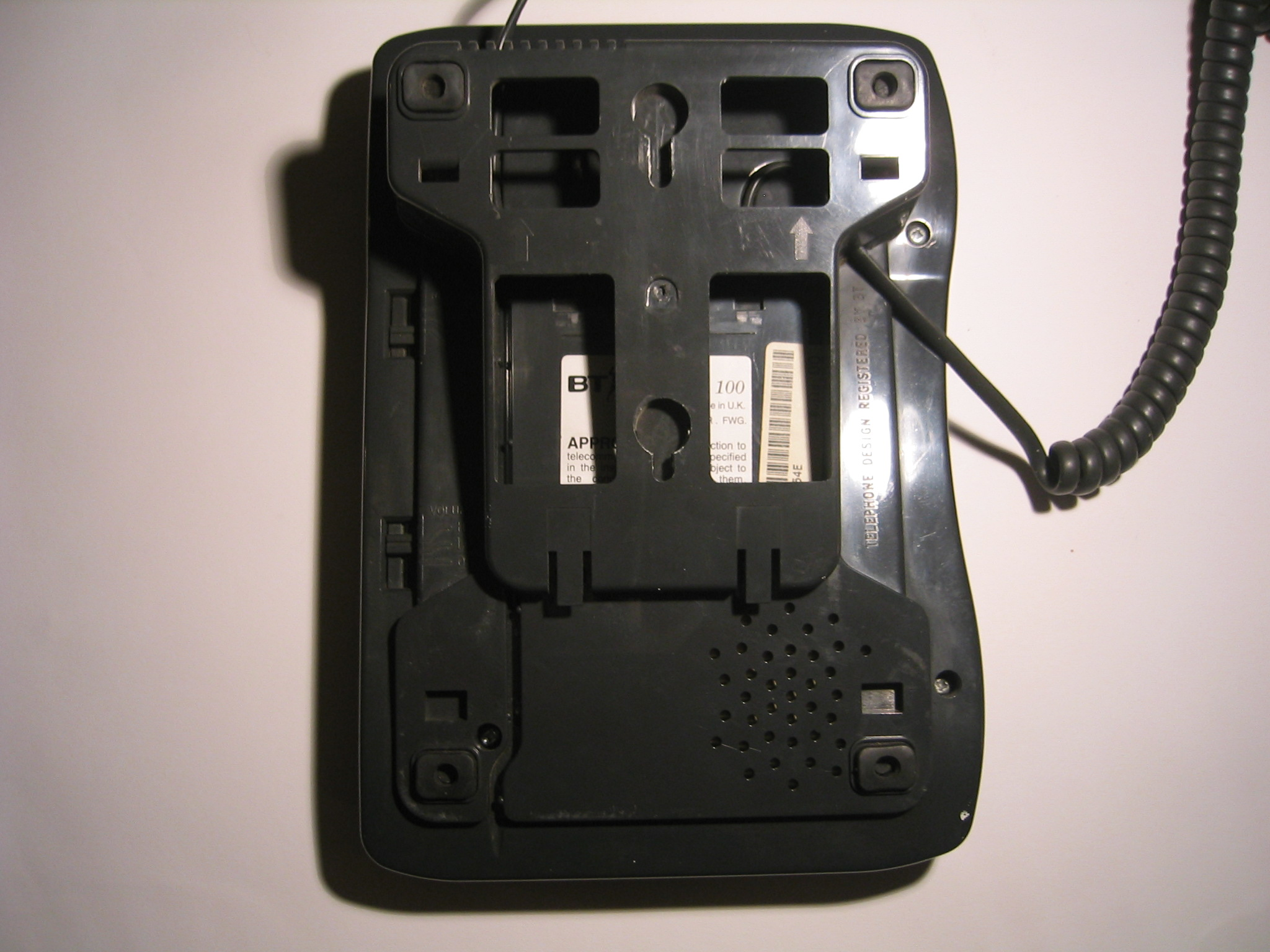
GPO Relate 100 Blue base, with switch on the left hand side to change from Loop Disconnect to MF4 and also the ringer volume

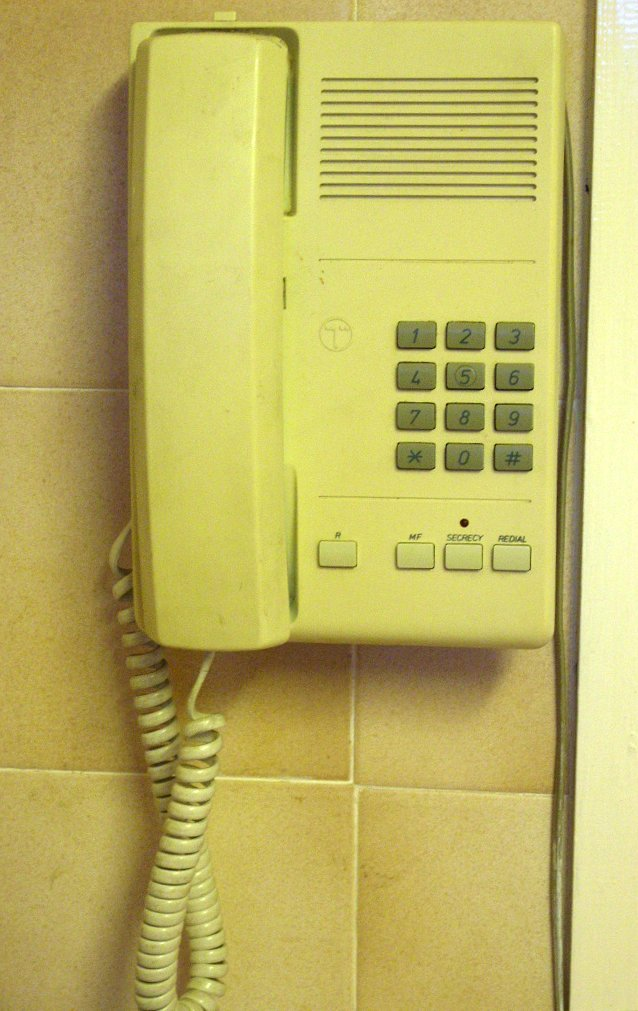
BT React, Ivory, wall mounted.

== Prelude ==
One of the first telephones with built in loudspeaking capability. This telephone is not a domestic instrument but one of many designed for use on early electronic office systems, with ten direct-dial extension buttons.

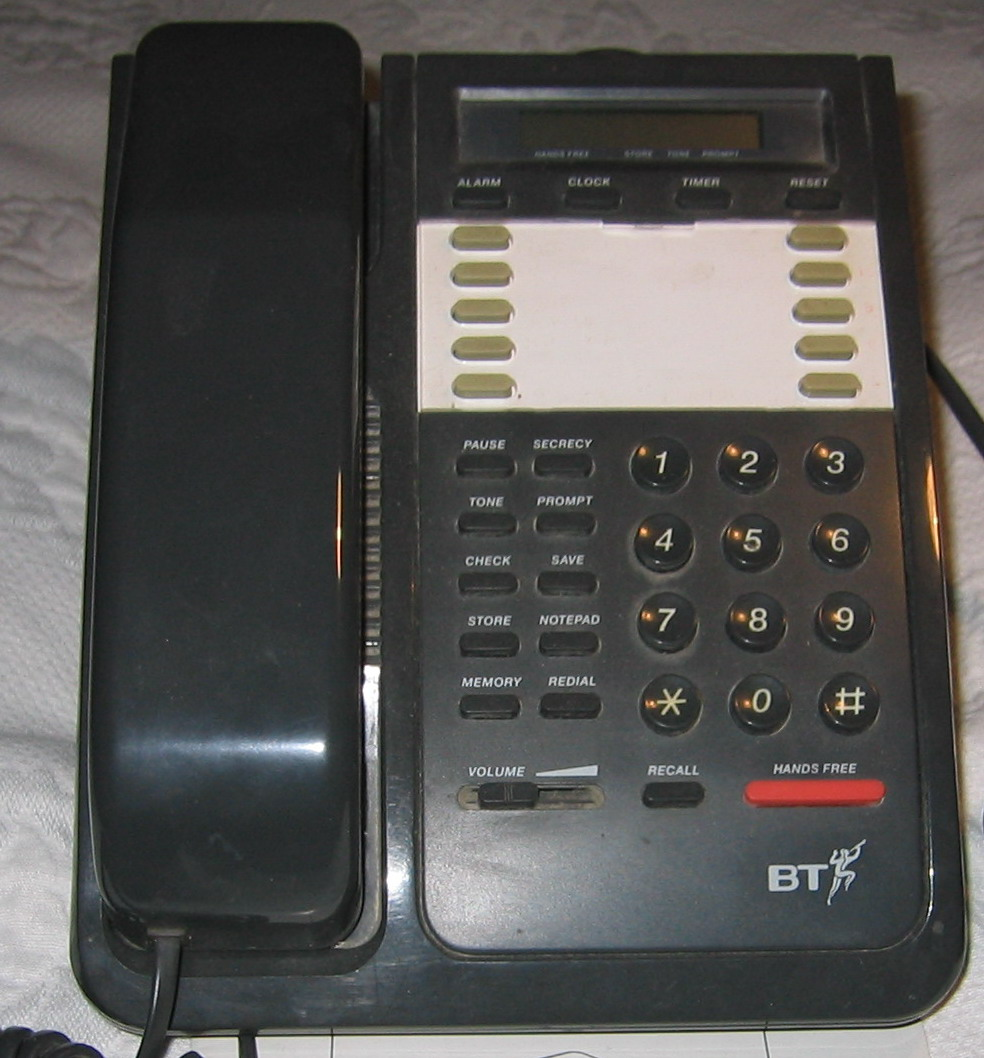
GPO Prelude
