= Thumbcast =

Thumbcast is a term used for the mobile delivery of text, picture, audio, or video content via short message service, multimedia messaging service, WAP push, or other mobile distribution mechanism. The term is an evolution specialized for original mobile content, coming from the generally audio-based podcast, the input mechanisms of multi-tap and predictive text, and the distribution of content directly to mobile phones.

== Timeline ==
- On 15 March 2007 US mobile media company 80108 Media launches their public Web site at , referring to the SMS subscription channels as thumbcasts. The company provided the following brief definition for the term:

Think: podcast for your phone. Our thumbcasts are hand-crafted by local correspondents and delivered direct to you as text messages.

- On 9 April 2007 the Boston Globe published an article titled Snippets of news, via cellphone with the following opening sentence:

Thumbcasts are coming to Boston.

The term 'thumbcast' became one of that day's 'Hot Searches' on the site.

== See also ==
- Podcast - Podcasting
- Phonecast - Phonecasting
- Screencast - Screen Capture Video Recording
- Videocast - Videocasting
- Micro-blogging - Micro-blogging
