= T9 (predictive text) =

Mobile phone technology

- Original authors: Martin King, Dale Grover, Cliff Kushler
- Developer: Tegic
- Release: 1997
- Successor: XT9
- License: Proprietary

T9, which stands for Text on 9 keys, is a predictive text software technology for mobile phones, specifically those that contain a 3×4 numeric keypad (which may be physical or virtual). It was originally developed by Tegic Communications with the goal to make typing on telephone keypads faster by eliminating manual multi-taps text input.

The T9 allows words to be guessed by a single button press per letter, using its internal dictionary database for the input language. When an ambiguous entry is inputted, the T9 displays possible outputs in a list for the user to pick the desired word. Custom words may also be added to the dictionary. T9's main competing technologies have been eZiText by Zi Corporation (with which Tegic fought a decade long patent war against), iTap by Motorola, Eatoni's LetterWise and WordWise, and SureType by RIM.

The first mobile phones with T9 integrated into their software came out in the late 1990s. It became very widely adopted across the industry during the boom of text messaging, to the extent that the "T9" name has turned into a generic name to describe mobile phone predictive text as a whole, even if it does not use T9's proprietary algorithm. As of 2010, the technology was present on more than four billion devices, mainly mobile phones and cordless landline DECT telephones. Around the same time, T9 usage had declined in favor of QWERTY layout typing on mobile devices.

== History ==
The development of T9 technology began in 1987 with the goal of creating an accessible text input system based on eye tracking. At the time that development was taking place, the eye tracking headsets in use could only identify eight distinct fixations. By grouping letters onto these eight target areas and constructing a database of commonly used words, the developers created a system for typing words by selecting one of each of the eight areas in sequence.

Martin King, Dale Grover and Cliff Kushler co-designed the technology. Initially the work was meant for a product for people with disabilities. They noticed that both their system of letter groupings and the numeric keypads on mobile phones used 8 inputs to represent every letter of the alphabet and chose to shift their development efforts towards mobiles.

King, Grover and Kushler filed the T9's now-expired (Note: Expired in 2015 per US patent law. https://www.goodwinlaw.com/en/insights/blogs/2020/02/when-does-my-patent-expire) patent in July 1995 to the United States Patent and Trademark Office, which granted it in 1998. The patent describes a "Reduced keyboard disambiguate system" as a tool a standard electronic device or a part of a desktop computing system. In 1996, King and Kushler incorporated Tegic Communications, Inc. in Seattle, Washington, to market and license the product.

At launch, dictionary databases were created in English, Finnish, French, German, Italian, Korean, Portuguese, Spanish and Swedish languages. Texas Instruments and Samsung Electronics were the first licensees of T9 and it was first released in September 1997 on the Avigo 10, a personal digital assistant (PDA) from Texas Instruments, on which T9 was utilized on its touchscreen-operated virtual keyboard. It was also bundled into the software of the Philips Nino PDA released in 1998 and was available as an optional add-on software for the PalmPilot. T9 for Palm OS was sold commercially for US$29.95 (equivalent to $59 in 2025).

The first mobile phone with T9 text input installed was the Samsung Anycall SCH-600 which was released on South Korea's CDMA network in April 1998 whereas the first GSM mobile phone with T9 was the Benefon iO announced in February 1999. The technology took off quickly as a result of the SMS boom in Europe that began in 1999. By the end of that year, Tegic had already licensed T9 to the biggest mobile phone makers, including Nokia, Motorola and Ericsson, and other manufacturers. T9 was expanded to 14 languages with the additions of Chinese (pinyin/bihua), Danish, Dutch, Japanese (gojūon) and Norwegian.

Over the years, T9 was also adopted on DECT home phones such as some Siemens Gigaset models. It was also experimented in the early 2000s in some automotive systems, such as in the Mercedes-Benz COMAND.

In December 1999, AOL agreed to purchase Tegic Communications. In August 2007, Nuance Communications purchased Tegic Communications from its parent company AOL. In 2012, Nuance sold the underlying software code and multi-modal predictive technology of T9 (which evolved into XT9 for automobile use) to Cerence. Nuance itself was purchased by Microsoft in 2022.

T9 dialling ability was added to Apple's iPhone with the release of iOS 18 in 2024.

== Design ==
A traditional E.161 telephone keypad (3x4) that can be used using the T9 software algorithm

T9's objective is to make it easier to enter text messages. It allows words to be formed by a single keypress for each letter, which is an improvement over the multi-tap approach used in conventional mobile-phone text entry at the time, in which several letters are associated with each key, and selecting one letter often requires multiple keypresses. While multi-tap text entry relies on explicit disambiguation to specify each letter, T9 uses implicit disambiguation in order to identify words that are a potential match for the input of letter groupings.

T9 combines the groups of letters on each phone key with a fast-access dictionary of words. It will then look up in the dictionary all words corresponding to the sequence of keypresses and order them by frequency of use. As T9 "gains familiarity" with the words and phrases the user commonly uses, it speeds up the process by offering the most frequently used words first and then letting the user access other choices with one or more presses of a predefined "Next" key.

The dictionary is expandable. After introducing a new word, the next time the user tries to produce that word, T9 adds it to the predictive dictionary. The user database (UDB) can be expanded via multi-tap. The implementation of the user database is dependent on the version of T9 and how T9 is actually integrated on the device. Some phone manufacturers supply a permanent user database, while others do so for the duration of the session.

== Features ==
Some T9 implementations feature smart punctuation. This feature allows the user to insert sentence and word punctuation using the "1"-key. Depending on the language, T9 also supports word breaking after punctuation to support clitics such as l' and n' in French and 's in English.

For words entered by the user, word completion can be enabled. When the user enters matching keypresses, in addition to words and stems, the system also provides completions.

In later versions of T9, the user can select a primary and secondary language and access matches from both languages. This enables users to write messages in their native language, as well as a foreign one.

Some implementations learn commonly used word pairs and provide word prediction (e.g. if one often writes "eat food", after entering "eat" the phone will suggest "food", which can be confirmed by pressing Next).

T9 can automatically recognize and correct typing/texting errors, by looking at neighboring keys on the keypad to determine an incorrect keypress. For example, the word "testing" is entered with the key combination "8378464". Entering the same number but with two incorrect keypresses of neighboring keys, e.g. "8278494", results in T9 suggesting the words "tasting" (8278464), "testing" (8378464), and "tapping" (8277464).

== Algorithm ==
In order to achieve compression ratios of close to 1 byte per word, T9 uses an optimized algorithm that maintains word order and partial words (also known as stems); however, because of this compression, it over-generates words that are sometimes visible as "junk words". This is a side effect of the requirements for small database sizes on the lower end embedded devices.

== Examples ==
On a phone with a numeric keypad, each time a key (1–9) is pressed (when in a text field), the algorithm returns a guess for what letters are most likely for the keys pressed to that point. For example, to enter the word "the", the user would press 8 then 4 then 3, and the display would display "t" then "th" then "the". If the less-common word "fore" is intended (3673) the predictive algorithm may select "Ford". Pressing the "next" key (typically the "*" key) might bring up "dose", and finally "fore". If "fore" is selected, then the next time the user presses the sequence 3673, fore will be more likely to be the first word displayed. If the word "Felix" is intended, however, when entering 33549, the display shows "E", then "De", "Del", "Deli", and "Felix". This is an example of a letter changing while entering words.

== Successors ==
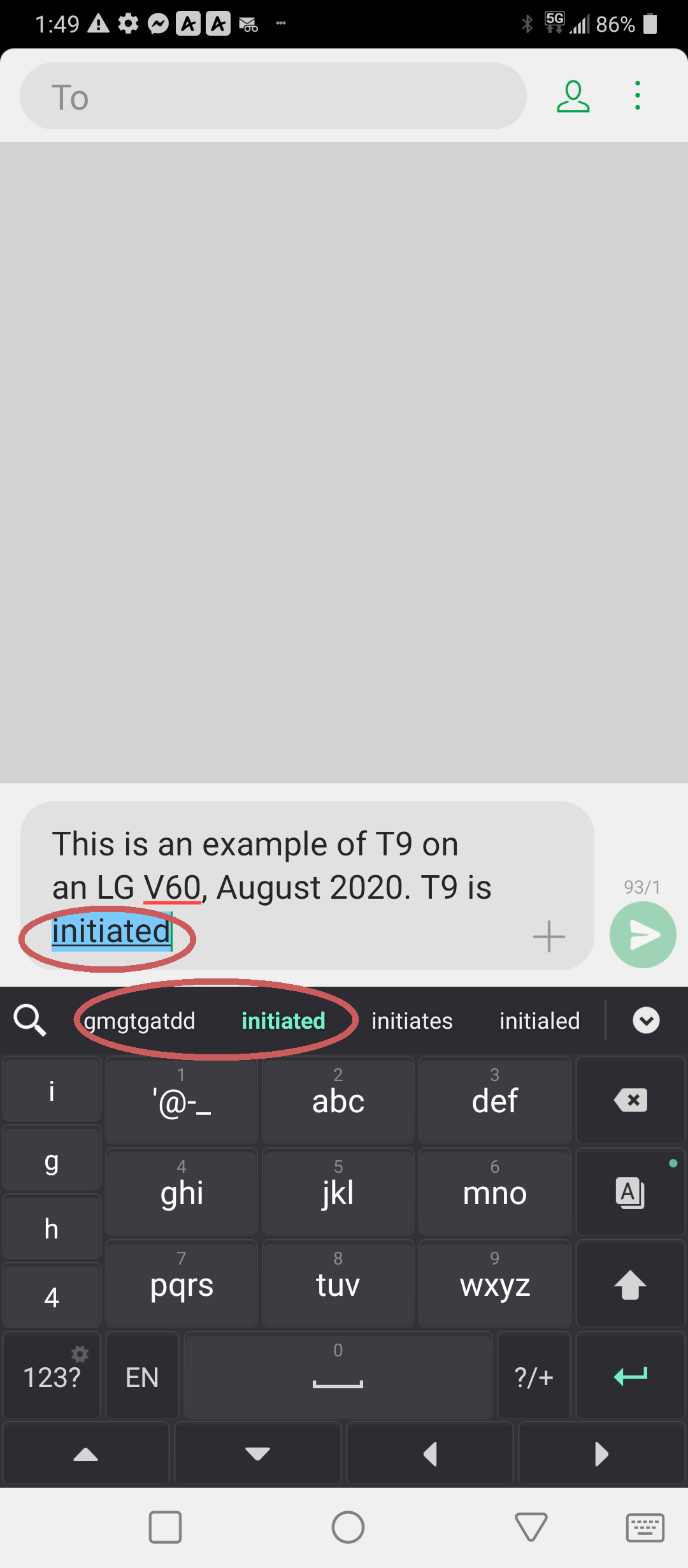
Image of T9 on a LG V60

Many smart keyboards now exist, such as Gboard or Swiftkey, that have taken the idea of T9 and combined it with the advanced touchscreen technology found in Android phones and iPhones. These advances have made T9 obsolete in newer mobile phones for many users, since it is predicated on the use of a keypad with nothing besides numbers, the asterisk (*) and the pound/number/hash sign (#). Many features, such as predictive text, have been adopted by and improved by future generations of keyboard software. However, T9 remains viable. For example, those with larger fingertips still use the T9-based keyboard on smartphones for text entry, because key press accuracy increases with the larger screen area per key on a numeric-style 4×3 keyboard. Such T9 formats for text entry therefore remain available in all latest [as of August 2020] iterations of LG keyboards, certain Samsung keyboards, and third-party T9 keyboards such as Go keyboard for Androids and Type Nine for iPhones, as shown on this LG V60.

== See also ==
- LetterWise
- Phoneword
- Predictive text
- Telephone keypad
- XT9
