= Avigo 10 =

The Avigo 10 (the only model of Avigo ever produced) is a Personal Digital Assistant ("PDA") that was marketed by Texas Instruments from the years 1997 through 2000. It was sold as a lower-priced competitor to the Palm Pilot.

== Technology ==
Like the Palm Pilot, the Avigo has a touch-sensitive monochrome LCD screen, and can synchronize with a host PC using either a docking cradle or an infrared wireless connection. Unlike the Pilot, it has no built-in handwriting recognition capabilities; instead relying on the "T9" brand predictive text entry software, in addition to an on-screen keyboard.

Physically, the Avigo is larger than the Palm Pilot series, but smaller than the earlier Apple Newton, measuring 5.5 in. × 3.25 in. × .75 in. The casing is plastic, with a charcoal-gray matte texture. It has a hard flip-cover to protect the screen when not in use.

Electronically, the Avigo has relatively modest computing power for a device from that era. The CPU is a modified 8-bit Z-80 microprocessor running at eight megahertz. It uses bank-switching to exceed the 64 kibibyte memory restriction; a stock Avigo is equipped with one megabyte of flash memory with 680 kilobytes available. The device is primarily powered by two AAA cell batteries, and uses a CR2025 lithium cell for RAM backup.

Some of the features of the Avigo that distinguish it from competing devices produced at the same time are:

- The aforementioned T9 predictive text input
- Support for running programs in the "landscape" orientation, in addition to "portrait"
- A larger screen than the Pilot, with no silk-screened writing area
- A built-in database application
- A slot for a memory expansion card (which expands the flash memory capacity to two megabytes)
