= LetterWise =

Patented predictive text entry systems

- E.161 keypad for text messaging
- Developer: Eatoni Ergonomics
- Release: 2000; 26 years ago
- Type: embedded application
- License: proprietary
- Website: LetterWise
- As of: May 2019

LetterWise and WordWise are predictive text entry systems developed by Eatoni Ergonomics, Inc. for handheld devices with ambiguous keyboards / keypads, typically non-smart traditional cellphones and portable devices with keypads. All patents covering those systems have expired.

LetterWise used a prefix based predictive disambiguation method and can be demonstrated to have some advantages over the non-predictive Multi-tap technique that was in widespread use at the time that system was developed. WordWise was not a dictionary-based predictive system, but rather an extension of the LetterWise system to predict whole words from their linguistic components. It was designed to compete with dictionary-based predictive systems such as T9 and iTap which were commonly used with mobile phones with 12-key telephone keypads.

== History ==
The court dismissed a claim that Eatoni Ergonomics came into being in the Spring 1998 as an orally agreed partnership between Howard Gutowitz, David A. Kosower and Eugene Skepner; the former pair having met as social acquaintances and Skepner noted for programming skills. The Eatoni project had the objective of developing reduced size keypads for portable devices. By August 1999 Kosower stopped working on the project due to a disagreements with Gutowitz over terms for setting up the new company and patents Gutowitz had or intended to file which was eventually to result in a subsequent lawsuit. In September 1999 Gutowitz went on to form Delaware limited liability company, Eatoni Ergonomics LLC and on 16 February 2000 formed the Delaware Corporation Eatoni Ergonomics Inc. with Gutowitz as CEO.

Eatoni composed a conference paper for March 2001 on Linguistically Optimized Text Entry on a Mobile Phone but it was not accepted.

In November 2001 at the 14th annual ACM symposium on User interface software and technology a paper prepared by academic Scott MacKenzie and Hedy Kober (Note: While this November 2001 paper notes Kober at Columbia University New York a paper submitted for March 2001 associates him with Eatoni Ergonomics) supported by three from Eatomi including Skepner described experimental results comparing LetterWise against other schemes though notably WordWise was for whatever reason absent from the presentation despite being announced over a year previously.

By May 2002 Gutowitz admitted adoption by established cell phone manufactures was proving difficult although Benq was taking the technology.

Eatoni was involved in a series of lawsuits and countersuits mobile phone manufacturer BlackBerry (RIM) between 2005 and 2012 relative to alleged patent infringement and a settlement to jointly develop software for a reduced keyboard in 2007 and take Eatoni equity stock in 2007.

In the 2010s Eatoni have examined applying the cellphone keytap technology to threatened languages, in particular N'ko; Gutowitz said he had eventually given up trying to get it supported by cellphone manufactures and begun to trial native language applications instead.

== Letterwise ==
=== Design ===
Unlike most if not all other predictive text entry systems, LetterWise does not depend on a work dictionary but is a prefix based predictive system. For each letter in the word the user taps the key associated with that letter on the keypad. If the letter chosen is the one required the user simply repeats the process for the next letter in the word, other Next is tapped until the required letter appears. It is claimed this is a very simple and efficient system to use, with no Multi-tap style time-outs or dictionary limitations. In an instruction manual it can be described in the following single sentence: "Hit the key with the letter you want, if it doesn't come up, hit Next until it does.".

Letterwise is not designed to be eyes-free, that is the associated device display must be monitored to perform the next action. This contrasts to Multi-tap and some two key systems where some skilled and expert users are able to input using whilst not referring to the screen.

==== Example ====
- Entering the word sirs which is a word with biases LetterWise strongly. A Multi-tap timeout will typically be one to two seconds wait for the cursor to move to the next letter but this can be interrupted by tapping the timeout kill or advance button (often down).

LetterWise and Multi-tap entry of the word "sirs"
Letter	Multi-Tap	LetterWise	LetterWise explanation
's'	Tap '7' four times	Tap '7' once	's' most probable from 'pqrs' as first letter
'i'	Tap '4' three times	Tap '4' once, then Next for 'i'	'i' 2nd most probable given first letter 's'
'r'	Tap '7' three times plus 'r' to 's' timeout	Tap '7' once	'r' most probable given first letters 'si'
's'	Tap '7' four times	Tap '7' once	's' most probable given first letters 'sir'
Total	14 taps and 1 timeout	5 taps	'sirs' is very favourable for LetterWise

A word such as mama would be more favourable to Multi-tap where 4 taps and no timeouts would be required; far less than the 14 taps and 1 timeout required for sirs.

==== Software app versions ====
Despite not included as a system keyboard, LetterWise was available in Email / Twitter / SMS / LiveJournal clients for Symbian, iOS as well as Qualcomm's BREW platform (distributed by the Verizon Wireless Get It Now service).

=== Performance ===
Performance figures for predictive text examples typically depend on use of natural language. Use of SMS language abbreviations and slang can reduce any advantage. (Note: It is possible to extend the a language to include these abbreviations and for word predictive techniques some will allow these to be added to the dictionary as words) For the tests done by Scott Mackenzie a selection of words from the British National Corpus were used as a representative sample of the English language.

LetterWise uses the probability of letters occurring in a particular sequence to achieve performance.

One measure of performance for text entry systems is "key strokes per character" (kspc). As a baseline the full English PC keyboard has a kspc of 1 as precisely one key stroke is required per typed character. Scott Mackenzie and other academics presented with Eatoni that they had evaluated LetterWise to have a kspc of 1.15 for English. This typically relates to one extra tap per 6 letters compared to standard keyboard. In contrast multi-tap, where a key is repeatedly pressed until the desired letter is found whereupon no further taps are made until the cursor moves to the next letter, has been evaluated to have a kspc of about 2.03.

The pangram The quick brown fox jumps over the lazy dog is sometimes used for keyboard practice. The Eatoni website claims this 35 letter nine word phrase requires only 14 additional keystrokes with LetterWise compared to 42 additional keystrokes for MultiTap.

=== Memory / storage requirements ===
Eatoni engineers claim LetterWise has relatively low storage requirements compared to dictionary based solutions. The Eatoni website claims in the storage space typically required for a single dictionary database (30–100kb) it would be possible to fit LetterWise databases for 10–20 different languages. The website says device random-access memory requirements are similarly low, typically under 2kb, and there has been an implementation for 200 bytes of available memory.

=== Experimental work ===
LetterWise was also used in TongueWise, a tongue-computer interface for tetraplegics using the LetterWise engine. Clinical evaluations showed LetterWise could offer an almost 50% increase in throughput compared to Multi-tap for English language words.

=== Chinese LetterWise ===
The Chinese LetterWise can be loosely described as a two-level version of alphabetic LetterWise. A phonetic character (e.g. Pinyin or Bopomofo) is entered on the first level which is converted automatically to Hanzi ready for the second level (Next Hanzi) key. As of May 2019 the Eatoni website showed three related cordless or answerphone physical devices from the same manufacture having adopted the technology.

== WordWise ==
Eatoni Ergonomics also developed and patented the dictionary word based predictive text input system WordWise announcing it in September 2000 with claims it was even faster than LetterWise. Wigdor and Balakrishnan indicated WordWise performs similarly to earlier techniques but with subtle advantages, though as with all predictive techniques the efficiency relied essentially upon the use of natural language with techniques such as abbreviations tending to nullify any advantage.

In addition to the standard version of WordWise Eatoni's website also notes they developed a more advanced version termed shift WordWise. (Note: While the advanced-WordWise was never released in a product certain papers may refer to the functionality and performance of this version) Shift-WordWise required use of a modified CHELNSTY keypad with those letters being selected by a shift key that could be allocated to the 1 button.

From his lawsuit Kosover alleges he has some input into the development of the WordWise system during his time at Eatoni to August 1999. It was designed to complement LetterWise and targeted for keyboards on mobile devices.

Eatoni's website indicates that it is possible for standard WordWise to add additional words to the dictionary on the device however this capability is no mentioned in Iridium satellite phone manuals so the capability might not be present on all versions of WordWise.

If WordWise is unable to suggest the required word either through it not being in the dictionary or due to a keying error the required word will need to be entered in another mode such as LetterWise which can be switched to relatively easily.

It has been suggested that WordWise is less sensitive to keystroke errors than competing T9 text prediction technology.

A multilingual WordWise implementation is included in Iridium satellite phones. Eatoni's website also indicated it was included as their SMS, Twitter and e-mail downloadable client applications for certain Symbian and Apple IOS based products.

== Adoption ==
Despite intensive marketing attempts in the early 2000s LetterWise and WordWise were not widely adopted by cell phone manufacturers with the Multi-tap and T9 system holding the market. LetterWise did find some adoption for DECT cordless phones, which were typically constrained by more limited resources, with Eatoni claiming over 20 million devices capable of LetterWise being shipped. From 2009 certain Iridium satellite phone models were shipped with both LetterWise and WordWise though not necessarily enabled by default; as of May 2019 some of these models seem current.
