= XT9 =

XT9 is a text predicting and correcting system for mobile devices with full keyboards rather than the 3x4 keypad on old phones. It was originally developed by Tegic Communications, now part of Nuance Communications. It was originally created for devices with styluses, but is now commonly used for touch screen devices. It is a successor to T9, a popular predictive text algorithm for mobile phones with only numeric pads. A small XT9 label on can be seen certain phones, mainly on HTC phones.
