= Adaptxt =

Predictive text application

- Developer: KeyPoint Technologies
- Initial release: 2000s
- Operating system: Android, iOS
- Platform: Mobile devices
- License: Proprietary
- Website: www.adaptxt.com

Adaptxt is a predictive text application for mobile phones, developed by KeyPoint Technologies, a UK-based software company. The application is designed to improve text entry on mobile devices by making it faster and error-free. It achieves this by predicting the next word as well as the word being typed, continuously adapting to the user's writing style and vocabulary.

== History and product features ==
Launched in 2006, Adaptxt supported Windows Mobile smartphones only. Adaptxt provides features such as context-based next-word suggestions, word completion, personal dictionary, dynamic language detection, conversion from SMS language to standard English and vice versa, multilingual text entry and a feature that learns new words and context while typing.

The application stores the new words in the user’s personal dictionary, where they can be edited. KeyPoint also claims that Adaptxt users can type in any of the installed languages without changing their keyboard language or dictionary, thanks to an engine capable of recognizing the language in use. This feature is supposed to be an added value for users who are bi-lingual or occasionally type in a foreign language.

A version for Symbian S60 smartphones was released in 2008, with improved support for third-party applications.

In April 2009, KeyPoint introduced a feature to scan personal data, including calendar entries, phonebook contacts, SMS and email inbox and sent items. The “Scan Facebook” feature learns words from the user’s Facebook profile. The new words learnt are added to the personal dictionary and offered as suggestions during text entry.

Later that year, KeyPoint also launched a new version of Adaptxt with error correction. This feature provides alternative suggestions for incorrect spellings. Automated correction of spelling mistakes were also made available, with an option to revert to the exact word entered by the user in case of unwanted corrections. All these features can now be found in the Symbian version of the product and most of them can also be found in the Windows Mobile version.

KeyPoint was also the first software company to introduce professional add-on dictionaries that provide industry-specific word and phrase suggestions related to a particular profession, such as medicine, law, IT and telecommunications, business and finance. Users can download additional language and professional dictionaries from the product website directly to their devices.

In May 2011, KeyPoint made Adaptxt open source through the project "OpenAdaptxt".

An Android-compatible version of the application has been launched in November 2011.

Adaptxt supports both touch-screen and hard-keyboard devices with 12-key, 20-key or QWERTY layouts. On 12-key phones, Adaptxt offers both Multi-tap and Predictive entry modes.

More than 50 languages and respective keyboard layouts are supported by Adaptxt, including: English US, English UK, European French, Canadian French, German, Italian, European Spanish, Latin-American Spanish, European Portuguese, Brazilian Portuguese, Danish, Swedish, Finnish, Norwegian, Icelandic, Estonian, Latvian, Lithuanian, Polish, Czech, Slovak, Hungarian, Slovenian, Serbian, Croatian, Greek, Turkish, Bulgarian, Romanian, Russian, Belarusian, Ukrainian, Galician, Basque, Catalan, Filipino, Indonesian, Malay, Vietnamese, Hausa, Hinglish, Arabic, Persian, Urdu, Hebrew, Hindi, Marathi, Arabic, Tamil, Telugu, Malayalam, Scottish Gaelic, Manx Gaelic and Irish.
