= ITap =

Predictive text system

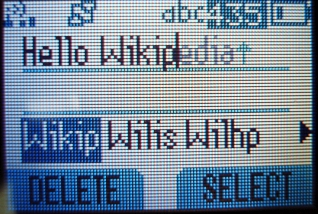
iTap in action

iTap is a predictive text technology developed for mobile phones, developed by Motorola employees as a competitor to T9. It was designed as a replacement for the old letter mappings on phones to help with word entry. This makes some of the modern mobile phones features like text messaging and note-taking easier.

When entering three or more characters in a row, iTap guesses the rest of the word. For example, entering "prog" will suggest "program". If a different word is desired, such as "progress" or words formed with different letters but requiring the same keypresses like "prohibited" or "spoil", an arrow key can be pressed to highlight other words in a menu for selection, in order of descending commonality of their use.

== Enter words ==
1. Press keypad keys (one press per letter) to begin entering a word. As the user types, the phone automatically shows additional letters that form a suggested combination.
2. Scroll right to view other possible combinations, and highlight the combination one wants.
3. Press direction key "up" to enter the highlighted combination when it spells a word. A space is automatically inserted after the word. In some implementations, pressing the button assigned the "space" character, usually the star (*) key, results in retaining the current stem, without inserting the rest of the offered completion.

If the phone does not recognize a word it then stores the word as an optional choice. When the memory space is filled the phone deletes the oldest word to make space for the new word.

== Development ==
iTap was released in October 1999. It was designed by Motorola's Lexicus division. Despite their own technology, Motorola still used a dual strategy by licensing T9 from Tegic as well. The first phone that had iTap was the Motorola Timeport L7089.

== Comparison with T9 ==
Similar to XT9 (the most recent version of T9), iTap is also able to complete words and phrases. iTap will guess the best match based upon a built in dictionary, including words sharing the typed prefix. This dictionary also contains phrases and commonly used sentences. This way the predictive guesses iTap offers are enhanced based upon context of the word that is being typed.

iTap typically uses a different user interface (UI) than T9 does. However, T9 provides an API that can be used to create a similar UI if phone manufacturers decide to do so. iTap provides suggestions for word completions after only one key press in all cases. However, T9 completes custom words after one key press and on most phones other words that users have entered previously can be retrieved after three key presses. T9 enables these UI decisions to be largely up to the phone manufacturer and so far none of them have chosen to mimic the UI of iTap with T9.

== See also ==
- LetterWise
