= Cliff Kushler =

Inventor and entrepreneur

Cliff Kushler is an inventor and entrepreneur who co-founded Tegic, the company that created T9 predictive input software used on mobile devices, and Swype, a technology for using swiping motions to type words on touch-screen keyboards. Prior to creating Swype he was a co-founder of Exbiblio and prior to that worked on products to help people who are unable to communicate verbally. Kushler holds numerous U.S. patents.

Dr. Kushler co-founded Swype in 2002. Before founding Swype, Dr. Kushler was the VP of R&D at Tegic Communications/AOL Wireless. Tegic, which was also co-founded by Dr. Kushler, developed a very successful text input method for cell phones called "T9" (later commonly referred to as "predictive texting") and was acquired by America On-line in 1999. T9 is now licensed on hundreds of millions of cell phones each year. Dr. Kushler holds 25 US patents, numerous foreign patents, as well as being a named inventor on 184 other US patents. He has an MS in computer science from Michigan State University, and a PhD in engineering from the University of Tokyo. He also speaks Japanese fluently and holds black belts in Shorin Ryu karate and Hakko Denshin Ryu ju-jutsu.
