= Texting etiquette =

Text messaging behaviour norms

Texting etiquette are the norms of appropriate texting behaviour. These expectations may concern different areas, such as the context in which a text was sent and received/read, who each participant was with when the participant sent or received/read a text message or what constitutes impolite text messages. At the website of The Emily Post Institute, the topic of texting has spurred several articles with the "do's and dont's" regarding the new form of communication. One example from the site is: "Keep your message brief. No one wants to have an entire conversation with you by texting when you could just call him or her instead." Another example is: "Don't use all Caps. Typing a text message in all capital letters will appear as though you are shouting at the recipient, and should be avoided."

Expectations for etiquette may differ depending on various factors. For example, expectations for appropriate behaviour have been found to differ markedly between the U.S. and India. Another example is generational differences. In The M-Factor: How the Millennial Generation Is Rocking the Workplace, Lynne Lancaster and David Stillman note that younger Americans often do not consider it rude to answer their cell or begin texting in the middle of a face-to-face conversation with someone else, while older people, less used to the behavior and the accompanying lack of eye contact or attention, find this to be disruptive and ill-mannered. With regard to texting in the workplace, Plantronics studied how we communicate at work] and found that 58% of US knowledge workers have increased the use of text messaging for work in the past five years. The same study found that 33% of knowledge workers felt text messaging was critical or very important to success and productivity at work.

Common online dating advice is to avoid dry texting, or the use of short, relatively low-effort messages, but this idea has been criticized by people who prefer having more substantive social interactions in other mediums, rather than texting.

== Dry texting ==
Dry texting is the habit or practice of writing short text messages. Sometimes it can be considered disrespectful. As of 2023 it is a relatively recently invented phrase, popular for example on TikTok, and refers to people who don't add much to conversations by text, to the extent of sometimes causing frustration. This style of texting has been compared to the use of pagers in the 1990s. Popular dating advice often describes this texting style as indicating a lack of interest, but this idea has been criticized by commentators who prefer to text in this style generally. A commentator from The Guardian also argues that this style of texting can make the shorter, more sporadic messages which are sent feel more meaningful when they arrive.

It can also refer to long response times between short messages, and describes more the overall tenor of the conversation than strict message length. Sometimes people text in a dry manner due to other obligations, social anxiety, or a deliberate attempt at distancing or passive-aggressiveness. However, some people prefer dry texting, with some popular commentators deliberately identifying themselves as "dry texters".

An example would be:

- A: How's ur day?
- B [2 hours later]: Just at the park.
- A [4 hours later]: Cool.

One research study on the topic concluded that the overuse of abbreviations can lead to perceptions of lower sincerity and effort, and generally more dry text conversations.
