= Tegic =

Seattle software company, developer of T9 predictive text for mobile phones

Tegic Communications, Inc.
- Type: Private (1996–1999); subsidiary (1999–2007)
- Industry: Software, predictive text
- Founded: November 18, 1996; 29 years ago
- Defunct: 2007
- Fate: Acquired by AOL (1999); subsequently acquired by Nuance Communications (2007)
- Headquarters: Seattle, Washington, United States
- Products: T9
- Parent: AOL (1999–2007)

Tegic Communications, Inc. was a software company based in Seattle, Washington, founded on 18 November 1996. It developed T9, a predictive text input system that became the dominant text-entry method on mobile phones during the late 1990s and 2000s. AOL acquired Tegic in December 1999, and Nuance Communications subsequently acquired it from AOL in August 2007, after which Tegic ceased to operate as a separate entity.

== History ==
Tegic was founded in Seattle in 1996 to commercialise a predictive text input method for devices with numeric keypads. Its core product, T9 (short for Text on 9 keys), allowed mobile phone users to compose text messages by pressing each key only once per letter, with the software using a built-in dictionary to predict the most probable word from the sequence of key presses. The approach reduced the number of keystrokes required compared to the multi-tap method, in which users pressed a key repeatedly to cycle through letters.

T9 was licensed to handset manufacturers and became one of the most widely deployed text input systems for mobile phones throughout the late 1990s and 2000s, appearing on devices from Nokia, Motorola, Samsung and others. The technology was particularly important during the period before smartphones with full touchscreen keyboards became common.

AOL acquired Tegic Communications on 3 December 1999. On 24 August 2007, Nuance Communications acquired Tegic from AOL, integrating the T9 technology into its broader portfolio of speech and language technologies. The Seattle office was expected to remain open following the Nuance acquisition, but Tegic ceased to exist as a distinct company.

== Litigation ==
=== Zi Corporation ===
There was a series of patent infringement lawsuits between Tegic, the holder of the T9 patents, and Zi, who had a rival software called eZiText:

- A patent infringement lawsuit by Zi against Tegic, filed in the District Court in Seattle for Japanese and Chinese character-based text input technologies was dismissed in September 1999.
- In February 2002, the District Court for Northern California granted Zi a partial summary judgment that eZiText for alphabetic does not infringe on Tegic's patents.
- In March 2002, the Federal District Court for the Western District of Washington granted Zi partial summary judgment stating that eZiText for alphabetic languages does not infringe Tegic's text input patents.
- In September 2002, the U.S. District Court for Northern California awarded Tegic, owned by AOL Time Warner, US$9 million in damages for Zi's infringement of two Tegic patents. Zi's claim that the two Tegic patents were based on existing methods of inputting Chinese ideographic characters were rejected.
- In August 2008 (by now Tegic dissolved after being acquired by Nuance), Nuance filed a patent infringement lawsuit against Zi in the Federal Court in Toronto, Canada, where Nuance accuses Zi of infringing Canadian Patent Numbers 2,399,961 and 2,278,549, each entitled "Reduced Keyboard Disambiguating System.

The litigations were very financially costly for Zi. In 2009, Nuance acquired Zi entirely, putting an end to a decade long patent war.

=== University of Texas ===
In 2005, the Board of Regents at the University of Texas (UT) sued as many as 48 cellular phone companies, including Motorola (who also rivaled Tegic with its iTap predictive text software), for patent infringement. UT argued that hundreds of mobile phones on the market violated an old patent owned by UT through the usage of predictive text input. Since Tegic was the software vendor for the vast majority of the sued companies (through the T9 technology), Tegic stepped in and filed a declaratory judgment lawsuit against the University of Texas. In 2006, Tegic and its allied phone manufacturers won the case by a ruling that there were no infringements of the university's patent.
