= Multi-tap =

Text entry system for mobile phones

An E.161 standard modern telephone keypad, as used for text messaging.

Multi-tap (multi-press) is a text entry system for mobile phones. The alphabet is printed under each key (beginning on "2") in a three-letter sequence as follows; ABC under 2 key, DEF under 3 key, etc. Exceptions are the "7" key, which adds a letter ("PQRS"), and the "9" key which includes "Z". Punctuation is typically accessed via the "1" key and various functions mapped to the "*" key and "#" key.

The system is used by repeatedly pressing the same key to cycle through the letters for that key. For example, pressing the "3" key twice would indicate the letter "E". Pausing for a set period of time will automatically choose the current letter in the cycle, as will pressing a different key.

It is commonly used in conjunction with text-messaging services. Some portable telecommunications devices (such as the BlackBerry) have bypassed the need for this by incorporating a mini-keyboard for users to type on. As of 2012, most mobile phones with fewer keys than alphabet letters offer a predictive text input method.

== See also ==
- Telephone keypad letter mapping
