= Predictive text =

Input technology for mobile phone keypads

Predictive text is an input technology used where one key or button represents many letters, such as on the physical numeric keypads of mobile phones and in accessibility technologies. Each key press results in a prediction rather than repeatedly sequencing through the same group of "letters" it represents, in the same, invariable order. Predictive text could allow for an entire word to be input by a single keypress. Predictive text makes efficient use of fewer device keys to input writing into a text message, an e-mail, an address book, a calendar, and the like.

The most widely used, general, predictive text systems are T9, iTap, eZiText, and LetterWise/WordWise. There are many ways to build a device that predicts text, but all predictive text systems have initial linguistic settings that offer predictions that are re-prioritized to adapt to each user. This learning adapts, by way of the device memory, to a user's disambiguating feedback that results in corrective key presses, such as pressing a "next" key to get to the intention. Most predictive text systems have a user database to facilitate this process.

Theoretically the number of keystrokes required per desired character in the finished writing is, on average, comparable to using a keyboard. This is approximately true provided that all words used are in its database, punctuation is ignored, and no input mistakes are made when typing or spelling. The theoretical keystrokes per character, KSPC, of a keyboard is KSPC=1.00, and of multi-tap is KSPC=2.03. Eatoni's LetterWise is a predictive multi-tap hybrid, which when operating on a standard telephone keypad achieves KSPC=1.15 for English.

The choice of which predictive text system is the best to use involves matching the user's preferred interface style, the user's level of learned ability to operate predictive text software, and the user's efficiency goal. There are various levels of risk in predictive text systems, versus multi-tap systems, because the predicted text that is automatically written provides the speed and mechanical efficiency benefit, which, if the user is not careful to review, results in transmitting misinformation. Predictive text systems take time to learn to use well, and so generally, a device's system has user options to set up the choice of multi-tap or any one of several schools of predictive text methods.

== Background ==
Short message service (SMS) permits a mobile phone user to send text messages (also called messages, SMSes, texts, and txts) as a short message. The most common system of SMS text input is referred to as "multi-tap". Using multi-tap, a key is pressed multiple times to access the list of letters on that key. For instance, pressing the "2" key once displays an "a", twice displays a "b" and three times displays a "c". To enter two successive letters that are on the same key, the user must either pause or hit a "next" button. A user can type by pressing an alphanumeric keypad without looking at the electronic equipment display. Thus, multi-tap is easy to understand and can be used without any visual feedback. However, multi-tap is not very efficient, requiring potentially many keystrokes to enter a single letter.

In ideal predictive text entry, all words used are in the dictionary, punctuation is ignored, no spelling mistakes are made, and no typing mistakes are made. The ideal dictionary would include all slang, proper nouns, abbreviations, URLs, foreign-language words and other user-unique words. This ideal circumstance gives predictive text software a reduction in the number of key strokes a user is required to enter a word. The user presses the number corresponding to each letter. As long as the word exists in the predictive text dictionary or is correctly disambiguated by non-dictionary systems, it will appear. For instance, pressing "4663" will typically be interpreted as the word good, provided that a linguistic database in English is currently in use, though alternatives such as home, hood and hoof are also valid interpretations of the sequence of key strokes.

The most widely used systems of predictive text are Tegic's T9, Motorola's iTap, and the Eatoni Ergonomics' LetterWise and WordWise. T9 and iTap use dictionaries, but Eatoni Ergonomics' products use a disambiguation process, a set of statistical rules to recreate words from keystroke sequences. All predictive text systems require a linguistic database for every supported input language.

== Dictionary vs. non-dictionary systems ==
Traditional disambiguation works by referencing a dictionary of commonly used words, though Eatoni offers a dictionaryless disambiguation system.

In dictionary-based systems, as the user presses the number buttons, an algorithm searches the dictionary for a list of possible words that match the keypress combination and offers up the most probable choice. The user can then confirm the selection and move on, or use a key to cycle through the possible combinations.

A non-dictionary system constructs words and other sequences of letters from the statistics of word parts. To attempt predictions of the intended result of keystrokes not yet entered, disambiguation may be combined with a word completion facility.

Either system (disambiguation or predictive) may include a user database, which can be further classified as a "learning" system when words or phrases are entered into the user database without direct user intervention. The user database is for storing words or phrases that are not well disambiguated by the pre-supplied database. Some disambiguation systems further attempt to correct spelling, format text or perform other automatic rewrites, with the risky effect of either enhancing or frustrating user efforts to enter text.

== History ==
The predictive text and autocomplete technology was invented out of necessities by Chinese scientists and linguists in the 1950s to solve the input inefficiency of the Chinese typewriter, as the typing process involved finding and selecting thousands of logographic characters on a tray, drastically slowing down the word processing speed.

The actuating keys of the Chinese typewriter created by Lin Yutang in the 1940s included suggestions for the characters following the one selected. In 1951, the Chinese typesetter Zhang Jiying arranged Chinese characters in associative clusters, a precursor of modern predictive text entry, and broke speed records by doing so. Predictive entry of text from a telephone keypad has been known at least since the 1970s (Smith and Goodwin, 1971). Predictive text was mainly used to look up names in directories over the phone until mobile phone text messaging came into widespread use.

== Example ==
A standard ITU-T E.161 keypad used for text messaging

On a typical phone keypad, if users wished to type the in a "multi-tap" keypad entry system, they would need to:

- Press 8 (tuv) once to select t.
- Press 4 (ghi) twice to select h.
- Press 3 (def) twice to select e.

Meanwhile, in a phone with predictive text, they need only:

- Press 8 once to select the (tuv) group for the first character.
- Press 4 once to select the (ghi) group for the second character.
- Press 3 once to select the (def) group for the third character.

The system updates the display as each keypress is entered, to show the most probable entry. In this example, prediction reduced the number of button presses from five to three. The effect is even greater with longer words and those composed of letters later in each key's sequence.

A dictionary-based predictive system is based on the hope that the desired word is in the dictionary. That hope may be misplaced if the word differs in any way from common usage—in particular, if the word is not spelled or typed correctly, is slang, or is a proper noun. In these cases, some other mechanism must be used to enter the word. Furthermore, the simple dictionary approach fails with agglutinative languages, where a single word does not necessarily represent a single semantic entity.

== Companies and products ==
Predictive text is developed and marketed in a variety of competing products, such as Nuance Communications's T9. Other products include Motorola's iTap; Eatoni Ergonomic's LetterWise (character, rather than word-based prediction); WordWise (word-based prediction without a dictionary); EQ3 (a QWERTY-like layout compatible with regular telephone keypads); Prevalent Devices's Phraze-It; Xrgomics' TenGO (a six-key reduced QWERTY keyboard system); Adaptxt (considers language, context, grammar and semantics); Lightkey (a predictive typing software for Windows); Clevertexting (statistical nature of the language, dictionaryless, dynamic key allocation); and Oizea Type (temporal ambiguity); Intelab's Tauto; WordLogic's Intelligent Input Platform™ (patented, layer-based advanced text prediction, includes multi-language dictionary, spell-check, built-in Web search); Google's Gboard.

== Textonyms ==
Words produced by the same combination of keypresses have been called "textonyms"; also "txtonyms"; or "T9onyms" (pronounced "tynonyms" /ˈtaɪnənɪmz/), though they are not specific to T9. Selecting the wrong textonym can occur with no misspelling or typo, if the wrong textonym is selected by default or due to user error. As mentioned above, the key sequence 4663 on a telephone keypad, provided with a linguistic database in English, will generally be disambiguated as the word good. However, the same key sequence also corresponds to other words, such as home, gone, hoof, hood and so on. For example, "Are you home?" could be rendered as "Are you good?" if the user neglects to alter the default 4663 word. This can lead to misunderstandings; for example sequence 735328 might correspond to either select or its antonym reject. A 2010 brawl that led to manslaughter was sparked by a textonym error. Predictive text choosing a default different from that which the user expects has similarities with the Cupertino effect, by which spell-check software changes a spelling to that of an unintended word.

Textonyms were used as Millennial slang; for example, the use of the word book to mean cool, since book was the default in predictive text systems that assumed it was more frequent than cool. This is related to cacography.

== Disambiguation failure and misspelling ==
Textonyms are not the only issue limiting the effectiveness of predictive text implementations. Another significant problem is words for which the disambiguation produces a single, incorrect response. The system may, for example, respond with Blairf upon input of 252473, when the intended word was Blaise or Claire, both of which correspond to the keystroke sequence, but are not, in this example, found by the predictive text system. When typos or misspellings occur, they are very unlikely to be recognized correctly by a disambiguation system, though error correction mechanisms may mitigate that effect.

== See also ==
=== Concepts ===
- Assistive technology
- Autocomplete
- Text entry interface
- Input method editor
- Text messaging
- SMS language
- Speech-to-text reporter
