= Number sign =

Typographic symbol (#)

#o

Number sign
- In Unicode: U+0023 # NUMBER SIGN (&num;)

Related
- See also: U+2116 № NUMERO SIGN; U+2114 ℔ L B BAR SYMBOL

The symbol # is known as the number sign, hash, and the pound sign and has a variety of other names. The symbol has historically been used for a wide range of purposes including the designation of an ordinal number and as a ligatured abbreviation for pounds avoirdupois – having been derived from the now-rare ℔.

Since 2007, widespread usage of the symbol to introduce metadata tags on social media platforms has led to such tags being known as 'hashtags', and from that, the symbol itself is sometimes called a hashtag.

The symbol is distinguished from similar symbols by its combination of level horizontal strokes and right-tilting vertical strokes.

== History ==
=== Speculated origin ===
A stylized version of the abbreviation for libra pondo (transl. pound weight)

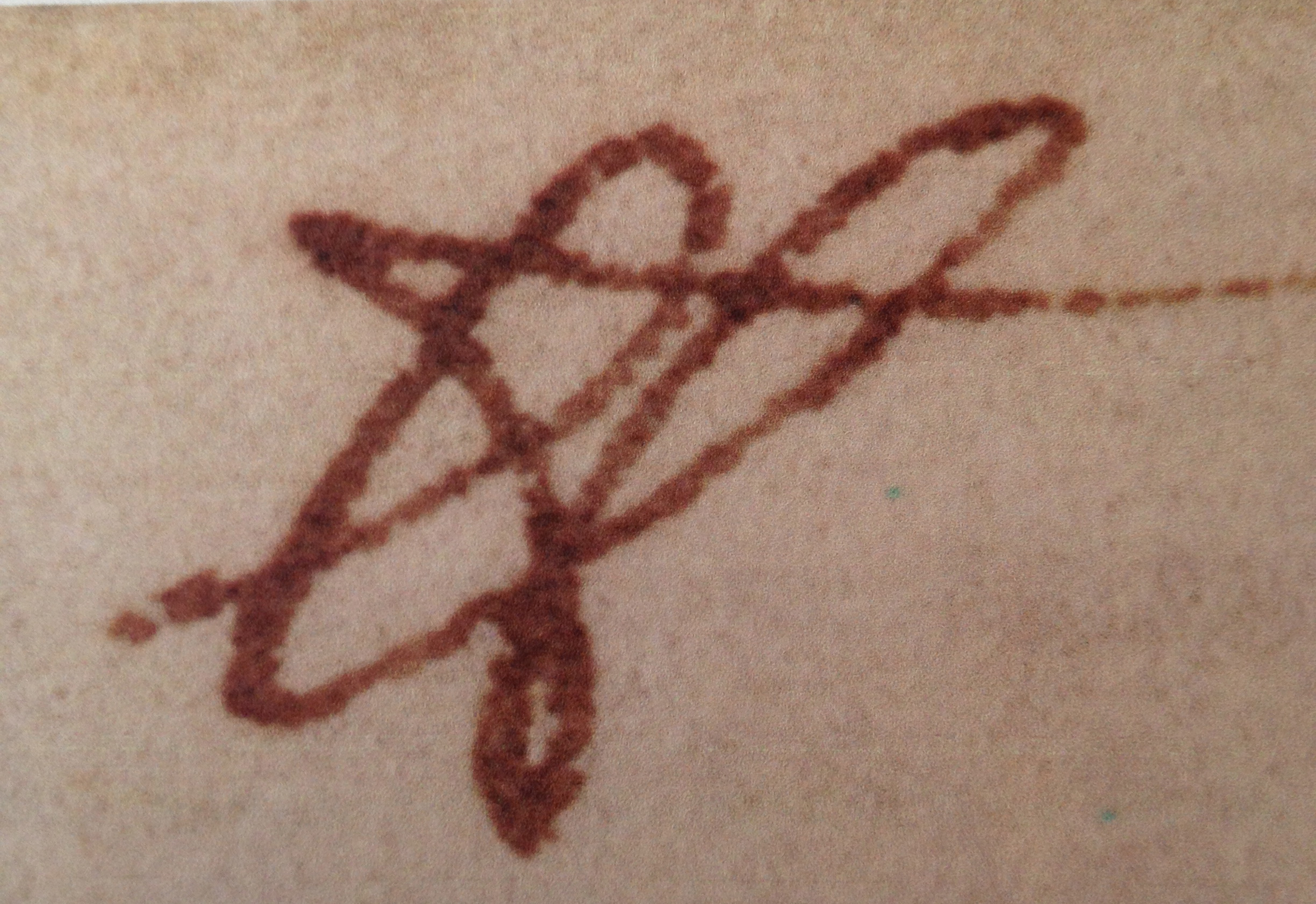
The abbreviation written by Isaac Newton, showing the evolution from ℔ toward #

It is believed that the symbol traces its origins to the symbol ℔, (Note: Represented in Unicode as U+2114 ℔ L B BAR SYMBOL) an abbreviation of the Roman term libra pondo, which translates as "pound weight". The abbreviation lb was printed as the dedicated ligature ℔, including a horizontal line across (which indicated abbreviation). Ultimately, the symbol was reduced for clarity as an overlay of two horizontal strokes = across two slash-like strokes //.

=== Similar historical signs ===
In printing, a sign similar to # is used as a correction symbol in margins to indicate a space is needed between two words, as noted in Joseph Moxon’s 1683 book Mechanik Exercises, in Philip Luckombe’s 1770 book on printing or the 1847 revision of Noah Webster’s Dictionary by Chauncey A. Goodrich.

A similar sign (like ⌗) has also sometimes been used as a sign for the ducat coin, other times included with abbreviations starting with D, or as a substitute for the milréis sign. In some 16th century German accounting manuscripts, the numero sign (№) is written with an N with two extra lines ornamenting it.. German language references from 1873 or 1892 show the symbol for 'ducat' (Ducaten) or 'number' (Nummer), printed as ♯ or ⌗, with number also represented with ⌗º. (Note: The º is U+00BA º MASCULINE ORDINAL INDICATOR. Compare with U+2116 № NUMERO SIGN)

=== Name and function ===
The number sign is described as the "number" character in an 1853 treatise on bookkeeping, and its double meaning (number & pound) is described in a bookkeeping text from 1880. The instruction manual of the Blickensderfer model 5 typewriter (c. 1896) appears to refer to the symbol as the "number mark". Some early-20th-century U.S. sources refer to it as the "number sign". A shorthand textbook written in 1903 refers to this symbol as the "pound or number sign" and details its two distinct uses (before and after a number). A 1917 manual distinguishes between two uses of the sign: "number (written before a figure)" and "pounds (written after a figure)". The use of the phrase "pound sign" to refer to this symbol is found from 1932 in U.S. usage.

=== Use on keyboards and computers ===
For mechanical devices, the symbol appeared on the keyboard of the Remington Standard typewriter (c. 1886). It appeared in many of the early teleprinter codes and from there was copied to ASCII, which made it available on computers and thus caused many more uses to be found for the character. The symbol was introduced on the bottom right button of touch-tone keypads in 1968, but that button was not extensively used until the advent of large-scale voicemail (PBX systems, etc.) in the early 1980s.

One of the uses in computers was to label the following text as having a different interpretation (such as a command or a comment) from the rest of the text. It was adopted for use within internet relay chat (IRC) networks circa 1988 to label groups and topics. This usage inspired Chris Messina to propose a similar system to be used on Twitter to tag topics of interest on the microblogging network; this became known as a hashtag. Although used initially and most popularly on Twitter, hashtag use has extended to other social media sites.

== Names ==
=== Number sign ===
Number sign is the name chosen by the Unicode Consortium. Most common in Canada and the northeastern United States. American telephone equipment companies which serve Canadian callers often have an option in their programming to denote Canadian English, which in turn instructs the system to say "number sign" to callers instead of "pound". This name is not used in many locations outside North America: in other countries that use Latin script, the term "number sign" may mean symbols like No..

=== Pound sign ===
In the United States and Canada, the # key on a phone is commonly referred to as the pound sign, pound key, or simply pound. Dialing instructions to an extension such as #77, for example, can be read as "pound seven seven". This name is rarely used elsewhere, as the term pound sign is understood to mean the currency symbol £.

=== Hash ===
In the United Kingdom and Australia, it is frequently called a hash (probably from hatch, referring to cross-hatching). This is also called a hash mark or hashmark.

The term hash sign is found in South African writings from the late 1960s.

Programmers also use this term; for instance #! is "hash, bang" or "shebang".

=== Hashtag ===
Derived from the previous, the word hashtag is often used when reading social media messages aloud, indicating the start of a hashtag. For instance, the text #foo is often read out loud as "hashtag foo" (as opposed to "hash foo"). This leads to the common belief that the symbol itself is called hashtag. Twitter documentation referred to it as "the hashtag symbol".

=== Hex ===
The term hex is commonly used in Singapore and Malaysia, as spoken by many recorded telephone directory-assistance menus: "Please enter your phone number followed by the 'hex' key". The term hex is formally discouraged in Singapore in favour of hash. In Singapore, the symbol is also called "hex" in apartment addresses, where it precedes the floor number.

=== Octothorp ===
The word octothorp (Note: known by various spellings, such as octothorpe and octathorp) or octatherp was invented by workers at the Bell Telephone Laboratories by 1968, who wanted to add an eleventh and a twelfth key to the telephone keypad and needed named symbols to identify them. While there is typically agreement that octo- or octa- is here the common prefix meaning eight, various stories abound about the nature of the thorp. Don MacPherson is said to have created the word by combining octo and the last name of Jim Thorpe, an Olympic medalist. Lauren Asplund declared that he and Howard Eby invented the word in 1964:

We finally decided in a jocular way to call the pound sign an “Octotherp”. That was because it had eight points and “therp” sounded Greek and also seemed to go well with the “octo” portion of the word.

Doug Kerr has written two essays about his recollections on the subject. In the first, in 2006, he wrote:

John C. Schaak and Herbert T. Uthlaut, engineers from two of the Bell Telephone companies [...] had read with interest the part of my report in which I regretted the absence of a unique typographical name for the character "#", and said they had solved my problem by coining one, octatherp. They said that it had no etymological basis, but they had been guided by one principle. They said they were irritated that I had rejected some candidate characters they thought were good on the basis of lack of compatibility with emerging international standards (with which the Bell System had a tradition at the time of little interest). Thus, they said, as a way of getting even, they had included in the name the diphthong [sic] "th", which of course does not appear in German and several other languages and thus might be difficult for users of those languages to pronounce, which would serve them right.

Later, in 2014, after conferring with Asplund, Kerr concluded that the name had likely been invented by Asplund after all:

Lauren Asplund, at the time a member of the data communications marketing group at the AT&T headquarters in New York City, with his AT&T headquarters engineering counterpart (whose name neither of us can recall) [...] devised the name “octotherp”. He tells me that the inspiration for “octo” was the eight free ends of the four strokes in the symbol. “Therp” did not have any logical premise, but just sounded sort of “Greek-ish”, and thus might confer some scientific stature upon the name. [...] Shortly after this had happened, John Schaak, an office mate of Asplund’s, and a long time personal friend of mine, called me and said that he had a gift for me. [...] the name "octatherp".

The Merriam-Webster New Book of Word Histories (1991), has a long article (largely consistent with Doug Kerr's later essay) which says "octotherp" was the original spelling, and that the word arose in the 1960s among telephone engineers as a joke. It concludes, after dismissing various other parochial theories:

How octotherp was coined is still a mystery, though we are told by a correspondent from the engineering community that it was coined as a lark, octo- for 'eight' as previously mentioned, and -therp when somebody burped. Such a tall-sounding tale is not entirely out of the question, given the arbitrariness of some modern scientific coinages.

Other hypotheses for the origin of the word include the last name of James Oglethorpe.

The first appearance of octothorp in a US patent is in a 1973 filing. This patent also refers to the complementary telephone star key as "the sextile or asterisk (*) key".

=== Sharp ===
Use of the name sharp is due to the symbol's resemblance to U+266F ♯ MUSIC SHARP SIGN. The same derivation is seen in the name of the Microsoft programming languages C#, J# and F#. Microsoft says that the name C# is pronounced 'see sharp'". According to the ECMA-334 C# Language Specification, the name of the language is written "C#" ("LATIN CAPITAL LETTER C (U+0043) followed by the NUMBER SIGN # (U+0023)") and pronounced "C Sharp".

=== Square ===
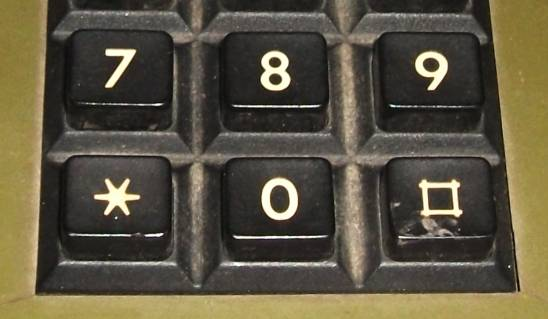
Detail of a telephone keypad displaying the Viewdata square

On telephones, the International Telecommunication Union specification ITU-T E.161 3.2.2 states: "The symbol may be referred to as the square or the most commonly used equivalent term in other languages." Formally, this is not a number sign but rather another character, U+2317 ⌗ VIEWDATA SQUARE. The real or virtual keypads on almost all modern telephones use the simple # instead, as does most documentation.

== Usage ==
When # prefixes a number, it is read as 'number'. "A #2 pencil", for example, indicates "a number-two pencil". This usage is historically rarer in print than the abbreviation 'No.', although '#' has recently overtaken 'No.' in total popularity worldwide, stemming from its newfound relatively overwhelming popularity in American English (but not British English). In addition to 'No.' and '#', the symbol '№' or just the word 'number' are also used. When used in this manner, # is often superscript, like: "a ^{#}2 pencil" — but typically not extending above the cap line.

When ⟨#⟩ is after a number, it is read as 'pound' or 'pounds', meaning the unit of weight. The text "5# bag of flour" would mean "five-pound bag of flour". This is rare outside North America.

=== Mathematics ===
- In set theory, #S is one possible notation for the cardinality or size of the set S, instead of $|S|$. That is, for a set $S = \{s_1,s_2,s_3, \dots , s_n\}$, in which all $s_i$ are mutually distinct, $\#S = n = |S|.$ This notation is only sometimes used for finite sets, usually in number theory, to avoid confusion with the divisibility symbol, e.g. $a \mid b$.
- In topology, A#B is the connected sum of manifolds A and B, or of knots A and B in knot theory.
- In number theory, n# is the primorial of n.
- In constructive mathematics, # denotes an apartness relation.
- In computational complexity theory, #P denotes a complexity class of counting problems. The standard notation for this class uses the number sign symbol, not the sharp sign from music, but it is pronounced "sharp P". More generally, the number sign may be used to denote the class of counting problems associated with any class of search problems.

=== Computing ===
- In Unicode and ASCII, the symbol has a code point as U+0023 # NUMBER SIGN and entity code &num; in HTML5.
- In many scripting languages and data file formats, especially ones that originated on Unix, # introduces a comment that goes to the end of the line. The combination #! at the start of an executable file is a shebang, hash-bang or pound-bang, used to tell the operating system which program to use to run the script (see magic number). This combination was chosen so it would be a comment in the scripting languages.
- In the C preprocessor (used by C and many other languages), # at the start of a line starts a preprocessor directive. Inside macros (after #define) it is used for various purposes; for example ## is used for token concatenation.
- In Unix shells, # is placed by convention at the end of a command prompt to denote that the user is working as root.
- # is used in a URL of a web page or other resource to introduce a 'fragment identifier' – an id which defines a position within that resource. In HTML, this is known as an anchor link. For example, in the URL https://en.wikipedia.org/wiki/Number_sign#Computing the portion after the # (Computing) is the fragment identifier, in this case denoting that the display should be moved to show the tag marked by <span id="Computing">...</span> in the HTML.
- Internet Relay Chat: on (IRC) servers, # precedes the name of every channel that is available across an entire IRC network.
- In lightweight markup languages, such as wikitext, # is often used to introduce numbered list items.
- In the Perl programming language, # is used as a modifier to array syntax to return the index number of the last element in the array, e.g., an array's last element is at $array[$#array]. The number of elements in the array is $#array + 1, since Perl arrays default to using zero-based indices. If the array has not been defined, the return is also undefined. If the array is defined but has not had any elements assigned to it, e.g., @array = (), then $#array returns −1. See the section on Array functions in the Perl language structure article.
- # is used in the Modula-2 and Oberon programming languages designed by Niklaus Wirth and in the Component Pascal language derived from Oberon to denote the not equal symbol, as a stand-in for the mathematical unequal sign ≠, being more intuitive than <> or !=. For example: IF i # 0 THEN ...
- In Rust, # is used for attributes such as in #[test], nested raw strings such as r#"Hello Wor"ld"!"#, and to use a keyword as a raw identifier: let r#match = true; (but this use is discouraged, because it makes code less readable).
- In OCaml, # is the operator used to call a method.
- In Common Lisp, # is a dispatching read macro character used to extend the S-expression syntax with short cuts and support for various data types (complex numbers, vectors and more).
- In Scheme, # is the prefix for certain syntax with special meaning.
- In Standard ML, #, when prefixed to a field name, becomes a projection function (function to access the field of a record or tuple); also, # prefixes a string literal to turn it into a character literal.
- In Mathematica syntax, #, when used as a variable, becomes a pure function (a placeholder that is mapped to any variable meeting the conditions).
- In LaTeX, #, when prefixing a number, references an arguments for a user defined command. For instance \newcommand{\code}[1]{\texttt{#1}}.
- In Javadoc, # is used with the @see tag to introduce or separate a field, constructor, or method member from its containing class.
- In Redcode and some other dialects of assembly language, # is used to denote immediate mode addressing, e.g., LDA #10, which means "load accumulator A with the value 10" in MOS 6502 assembly language.
- in HTML, CSS, SVG, and other computing applications # is used to identify a color specified in hexadecimal format, e.g., #FFAA00. This usage comes from X11 color specifications, which inherited it from early assembler dialects that used # to prefix hexadecimal constants, e.g.: ZX Spectrum Z80 assembly.
- In Be-Music Script, every command line starts with #. Lines starting with characters other than # are treated as comments.
- The use of the hash symbol in a hashtag is a phenomenon conceived by Chris Messina, and popularized by social media network Twitter, as a way to direct conversations and topics amongst users. This has led to an increasingly common tendency to refer to the symbol itself as hashtag.
- In programming languages like PL/1 and Assembler used on IBM mainframe systems, as well as JCL (Job Control Language), the # (along with $ and @) are used as additional letters in identifiers, labels and data set names.
- In J, # is the Tally or Count function, and similarly in Lua, # can be used as a shortcut to get the length of a table, or get the length of a string. Due to the ease of writing # over longer function names, this practice has become standard in the Lua community.
- In Dyalog APL, # is a reference to the root namespace while ## is a reference to the current space's parent namespace.
- In Ada, the # character is used in based integer literals, which take the form base#digits#, where base is an integer from 2 to 16 specifying the radix, and digits are the digits valid in that base (0-9, optionally A-F for bases above 10).

=== Other uses ===
- Algebraic notation for chess: A hash after a move denotes checkmate.
- American Sign Language transcription: The hash prefixing an all-caps word identifies a lexicalized fingerspelled sign, having some sort of blends or letter drops. All-caps words without the prefix are used for standard English words that are fingerspelled in their entirety.
- Copy writing and copy editing: Technical writers in press releases often use three number signs, ### directly above the boilerplate or underneath the body copy, indicating to media that there is no further copy to come.
- Footnote symbols (or endnote symbols): Due to its ready availability in many computer fonts and directly on computer keyboards, # and other symbols (such as the caret (^)) have in recent years begun to be occasionally used in catalogues and reports in place of more traditional symbols (esp. dagger, double-dagger, pilcrow).
- Linguistic phonology: # denotes a word boundary. For instance, /d/ → [t] / _# means that /d/ becomes [t] when it is the last segment in a word (i.e. when it appears before a word boundary).
- Linguistic syntax: A hash before an example sentence denotes that the sentence is semantically ill-formed, though grammatically well-formed. For instance, "#The toothbrush is pregnant" is a grammatically correct sentence, but the meaning is odd.
- Medical prescription drug delimiter: In some countries, such as Norway or Poland, # is used as a delimiter between different drugs on medical prescriptions.
- Medical shorthand: The hash is often used to indicate a bone fracture. For example, #NOF is often used for "fractured neck of femur". In radiotherapy, a full dose of radiation is divided into smaller doses or 'fractions'. These are given the shorthand # to denote either the number of treatments in a prescription (e.g. 60Gy in 30#), or the fraction number (#9 of 25).
- As a proofreading mark, to indicate that a space should be inserted.
- Publishing: When submitting a science fiction manuscript for publication, a number sign on a line by itself (indented or centered) indicates a section break in the text.
- Scrabble: Putting a number sign after a word indicates that the word is found in the British word lists, but not the North American lists.
- Teletext and DVB subtitles (in the UK and Ireland): The hash symbol, resembling music notation's sharp sign, is used to mark text that is either sung by a character or heard in background music, e.g. # For he's a jolly good fellow #

== Unicode ==
The number sign was assigned code 35 (hex 0x23) in ASCII where it was inherited by many character sets. In EBCDIC it is often at 0x7B or 0xEC.

Unicode characters with 'number sign' in their names:

- U+0023 # NUMBER SIGN (Other attested names in Unicode are: pound sign (weight), hashtag, hash, crosshatch, octothorpe.)
- U+0600 ؀ ARABIC NUMBER SIGN
- U+0BFA ௺ TAMIL NUMBER SIGN
- U+1AC6 ᫆ COMBINING NUMBER SIGN ABOVE
- U+FE5F ﹟ SMALL NUMBER SIGN
- U+FF03 ＃ FULLWIDTH NUMBER SIGN
- U+110BD KAITHI NUMBER SIGN
- U+110CD 𑃍 KAITHI NUMBER SIGN ABOVE
- U+11FE9 𑿩 TAMIL TRADITIONAL NUMBER SIGN
- U+E0023 TAG NUMBER SIGN

Additionally, a Unicode named sequence KEYCAP NUMBER SIGN is defined for the grapheme cluster U+0023+FE0F+20E3 (#️⃣). (Note: U+0023 # NUMBER SIGN, U+FE0F ️ VARIATION SELECTOR-16, U+20E3 ⃣ COMBINING ENCLOSING KEYCAP)

== On keyboards ==
On the standard US keyboard layout, the # symbol is ⇧ Shift+3. On standard UK and some other European keyboards, the same keystrokes produce the pound (sterling) sign, £ symbol, and # may be moved to a separate key above the right shift key.

== See also ==
- U+266F ♯ MUSIC SHARP SIGN
- U+2317 ⌗ VIEWDATA SQUARE
- U+22D5 ⋕ EQUAL AND PARALLEL TO
- U+2318 ⌘ PLACE OF INTEREST SIGN ("looped square")
- U+4E95 井 CJK UNIFIED IDEOGRAPH-4E95, the Chinese character for a well (Chinese: 井; pinyin: jǐng; Jyutping: zeng2)
- the game tic-tac-toe, which uses a similar grid pattern
