= E.161 =

ITU-T Recommendation for keypads and dials

- Arrangement of digits, letters and symbols on telephones and other devices that can be used for gaining access to a telephone network
- A standard E.161 keypad
- Status: In force
- Year started: 1988
- Latest version: (02/01); February 2001
- Organization: ITU-T
- Domain: telecommunication
- License: Freely available
- Website: https://www.itu.int/rec/T-REC-E.161

Recommendation E.161 is a technical standard by the ITU-T defining the arrangement of digits, letters, and symbols on telephone keypads and rotary dials. It also defines the recommended mapping between the basic Latin alphabet and digits (e.g., "DEF" on 3). Uses for this mapping include:

- Multi-tap and predictive text systems.
- Forming phonewords from telephone numbers.
- Using alphabetic characters (e.g. as a mnemonic) in a personal identification number.

Keypads are specified both in the common 4 × 3 and several variations, such as 6 × 2 and 2 × 5. E.161 also specifies the dimensions and characteristics of the star and square, referred to in the standard as the 'star' and 'square' keys, respectively. (In practice, the 'square' key is almost invariably replaced by the number sign. (Note: Known in many countries as the 'hash' key.) and the sextile symbol is the more common choice for the star key. (Note: The precise symbol to be used is not standardised: ∗ (U+2217 ∗ ASTERISK OPERATOR) and ⚹ (U+26B9 ⚹ SEXTILE) have been recommended. A simple asterisk (* U+002A * ASTERISK) is often seen in informal documents.))

The standard also recommends that a tactile identifier be placed on the 5 key to make it easier to use the keypad in low-light conditions or by the visually impaired, as well as multiple alternative methods to implement a recall button.

ETSI ETS 300 640 and ISO 9995-8 also address keypad layout. Language-specific letters (e.g. ü, é, å, ä, ö) as well as other characters (e.g. ‘€’ or ‘@’) are not addressed, which has led to a variety of inconsistent solutions for European languages.

The E.161 layout is primarily based on the layout used on American telephones since the 1930s for telephone exchange names. Until the 1990s, Q and Z were not included in the standard layout, and since the letters served mainly as mnemonic devices, they were not necessary (Q and Z were not used in phonewords); telephones either omitted them, placed Q and Z onto the 1 key, or included Q and Z on the current locations, with PRS on 7 and WXY on 9. The development of text messaging on mobile phones, which required the full range of the alphabet, led to the need to standardize locations for Q and Z on mobile devices. E.161 adopted the current layout in response to this.
