= Telephone keypad =

Keypad that appears on some telephones

A telephone keypad using the ITU E.161 standard. (The 'star key' uses a sextile symbol.)

A telephone keypad is a keypad installed on a push-button telephone or similar telecommunication device for dialing a telephone number. It was standardized when the dual-tone multi-frequency signaling (DTMF) system was developed in the Bell System in the United States in the 1960s – this replaced rotary dialing, that had been developed for electromechanical telephone switching systems. Because of the abundance of rotary dial equipment still on use well into the 1990s, many telephone keypads were also designed to be backwards-compatible: as well as producing DTMF pulses, they could optionally be switched to produce loop-disconnect pulses electronically.

The development of the modern telephone keypad is attributed to research in the 1950s by Richard Deininger under the directorship of John Karlin at the Human Factors Engineering Department of Bell Labs. The modern keypad is laid out in a rectangular array of twelve push buttons arranged as four rows of three keys each. For military applications, a fourth column of keys was added to the right for priority signaling in the Autovon system in the 1960s. Initially, between 1963 and 1968, the keypads for civilian subscriber service omitted the lower left and lower right keys. These two keys are commonly labelled star, ⚹, and number sign/hash, #, respectively, and produce the signals associated with those symbols. These keys were added to provide signals for anticipated data entry purposes in business applications, but found use in Custom Calling Services (CLASS) features installed in electronic switching systems.

== Layout ==
A standard telephone keypad

The layout of the digit keys is different from that commonly appearing on calculators and numeric keypads. This layout was chosen after extensive human factors testing at Bell Labs. At the time (late 1950s), mechanical calculators were not widespread, and few people had experience with them. Indeed, calculators were only just starting to settle on a common layout; a 1955 paper states "Of the several calculating devices we have been able to look at ... Two other calculators have keysets resembling [the layout that would become the most common layout] ... . Most other calculators have their keys reading upward in vertical rows of ten." Meanwhile, a 1960 paper – just five years later – refers to today's common calculator layout as "the arrangement frequently found in ten-key adding machines". In any case, Bell Labs' testing found that the telephone layout with 1, 2, and 3 on the top row, was slightly faster in use than the calculator layout with them in the bottom row.

=== Star key and square key ===
In addition to the numbers, the ITU recommends two additional keys: the "star key", labeled ⚹, and the "square key", labeled ⌗. The square key is often known as the pound key, hash key or octothorp.

The precise symbols to be used for the star and square keys is not standardised: asterisk operator (∗) and sextile (⚹) have been recommended for the star key, and a simple asterisk * is often used. The "square key" is almost invariably replaced with the # (number sign). A 1973 US patent (3,920,926) by the Northern Electric Company calls them "sextile or asterisk" and "octothorp".

These can be used for special functions. For example, in the UK, users can order a 7:30 am alarm call from a BT telephone exchange by dialing: ⚹55⚹0730#.

The Greek symbols alpha and omega had been suggested originally for these keys. John A. Koten (1929–2014), a corporate communications specialist with Bell Labs in Chicago, claimed credit for the choice of star and number sign, reasoning that the new keys would be easier to explain to a public already familiar with typewriter symbols.

=== Letters ===
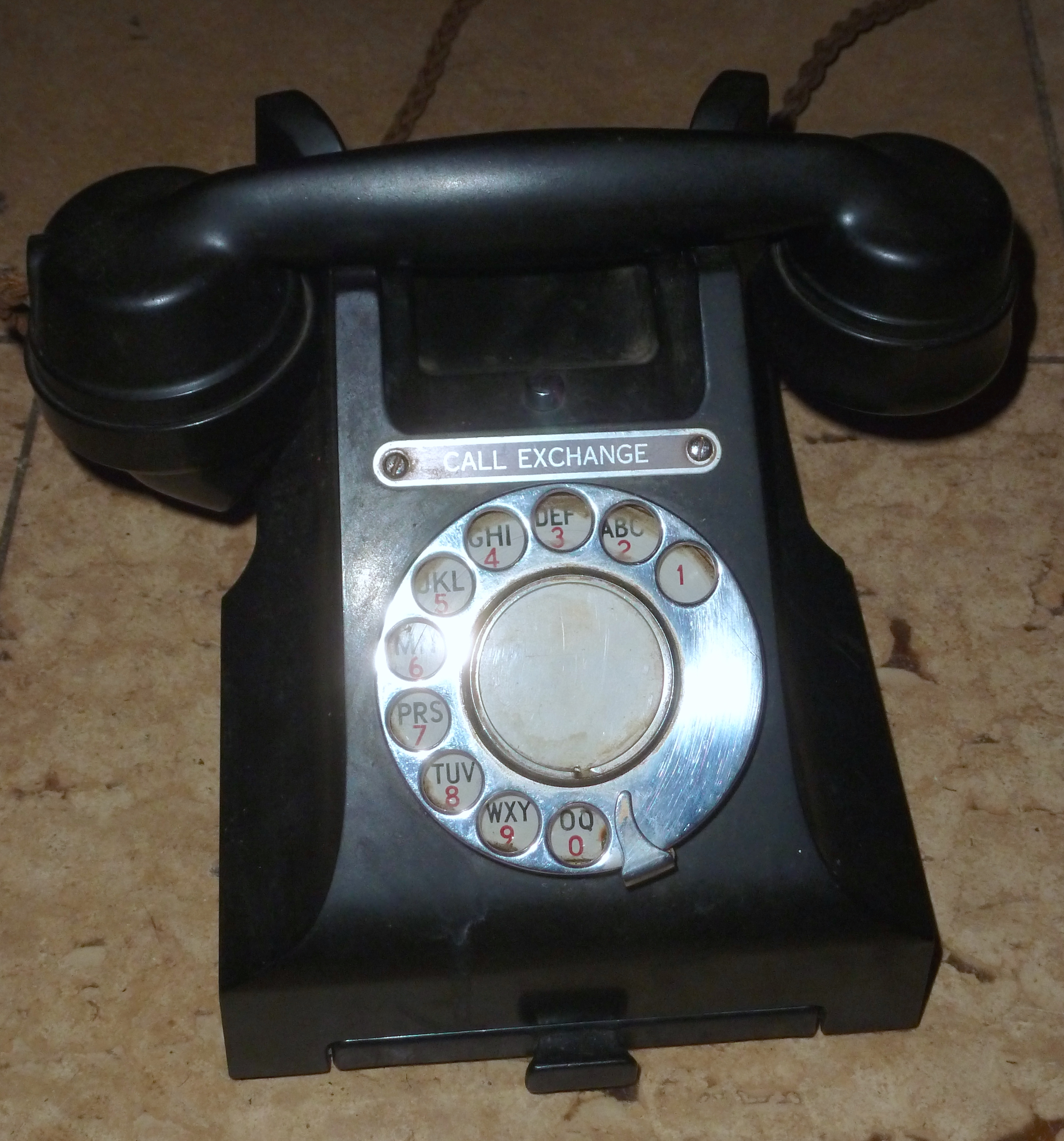
Telephone with letters on its rotary dial (1950s, UK)

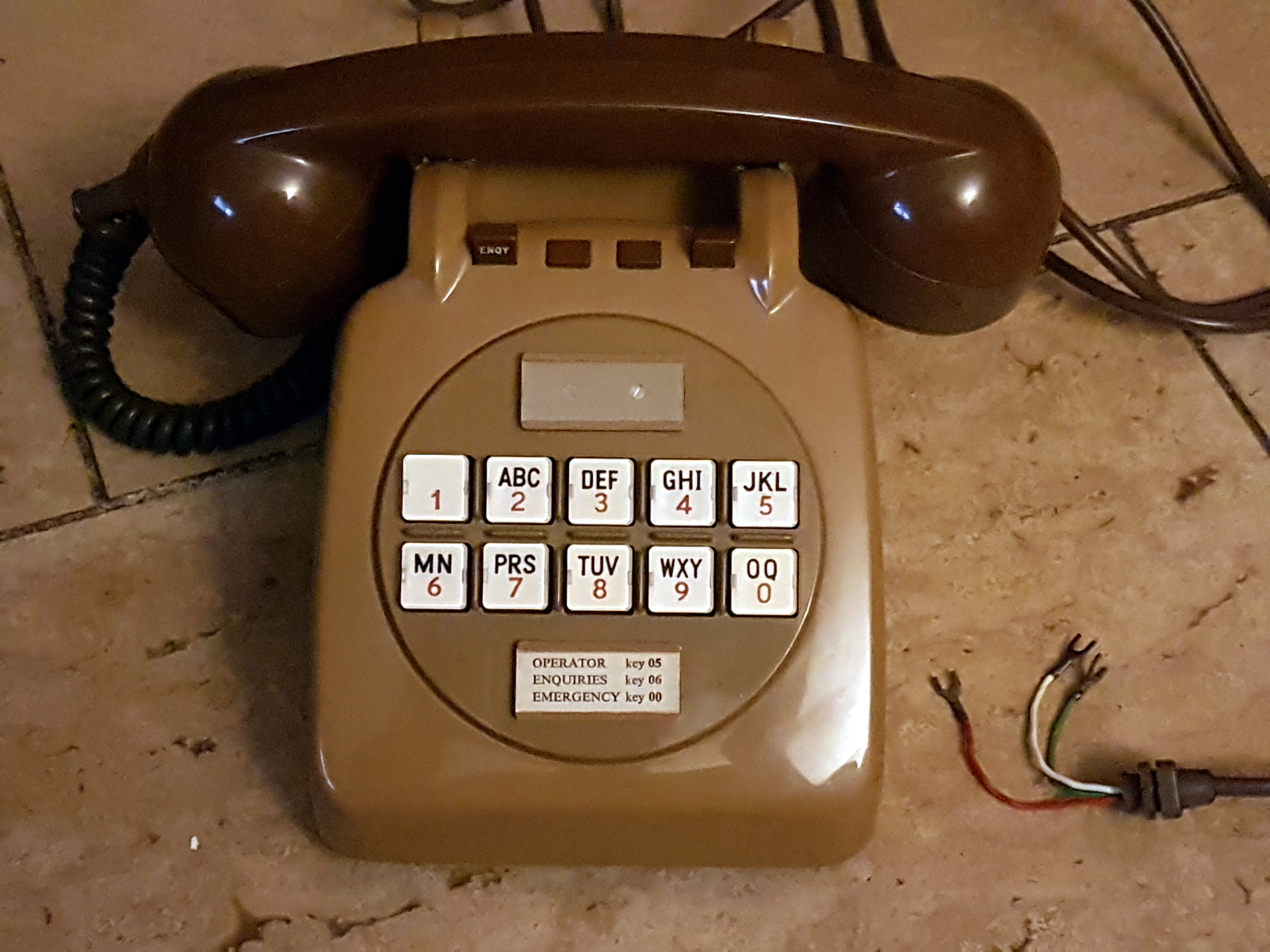
British GPO 726 telephone of 1967

In the Americas and a number of other countries, most dials and, later, keypads also bear letters according to the following system:

Key	Letters
1	none (on some older telephones, QZ)
2	ABC
3	DEF
4	GHI
5	JKL
6	MNO (on some older telephones, MN)
7	PQRS (on older telephones, PRS)
8	TUV
9	WXYZ (on older telephones, WXY)
0	none (on some telephones, "OPERATOR" or "OPER")

In the UK, dials and keypads also bore letters, though these were later dropped. They were arranged as follows:

Key	Letters
1	none
2	ABC
3	DEF
4	GHI
5	JKL
6	MN
7	PRS
8	TUV
9	WXY
0	OQ

For the above system, O and Q are set together on the 0 key. In addition to O and 0 being graphically similar to indistinguishable, when reciting sequences of numbers in English it is common to substitute "oh" for zero or nought; Q is visually similar to O, causing plausible confusion. Therefore, two possible mistakes were avoided.

These letter assignments have been used for multiple purposes. Originally, they referred to the dialable letters of telephone exchange names. In the mid-20th century United States, before the switch to all-number calling, telephone numbers had seven symbols, including a two-symbol prefix which was expressed in letters rather than digits, e.g.; KL5-5445. The UK telephone numbering system used a similar two-letter code after an initial zero (the zero prefix selected trunk dialling) to form the first part of the subscriber trunk dialling code for a region; the letters were followed by one or more digits. For example, Aylesbury was assigned 0AY6, which translated to 0296.

The official toll-free hotline for the California Department of Transportation's adopt-a-Highway program is 1-866-236-7824, but signs advertise the number as 1-866-ADOPTAHWY, with two extra digits, for memorability.

The letters have also been used, mainly in the United States, as a technique for remembering telephone numbers easily. For example, an interior decorator might license the telephone number 1-800-724-6837, but advertise it as the more memorable phoneword "1-800-PAINTER". Sometimes businesses advertise a number with a mnemonic word having more letters than there are digits in the phone number. Usually, this means that the caller just stops dialing at seven digits after the area code or that the extra digits are ignored by the telephone exchange.

In early cell phones, or feature phones, the letters on the keys are used for text entry tasks such as text messaging, entering names in the phone book, and browsing the web. To compensate for the smaller number of keys, phones used multi-tap and later predictive text processing to speed up the process. Touchscreen phones have made these input methods obsolete, as the screens are typically large enough to show as many virtual buttons as necessary for a full keyboard.

== Key tones ==
Pressing a single key of a traditional analog telephone keypad produces a telephony signaling event to the remote switching system. For touchtone service, the signal is a dual-tone multi-frequency signaling tone consisting of two simultaneous pure tone sinusoidal frequencies. The row in which the key appears determines the low-frequency component, and the column determines the high-frequency component. For example, pressing key 1 results in a signal composed of tones with frequencies 697 hertz (Hz) and 1209 Hz.

DTMF keypad frequencies (with sound clips)
	1209 Hz	1336 Hz	1477 Hz	1633 Hz
697 Hz	1	2	3	A
770 Hz	4	5	6	B
852 Hz	7	8	9	C
941 Hz	*	0	#	D

== Letter mapping ==
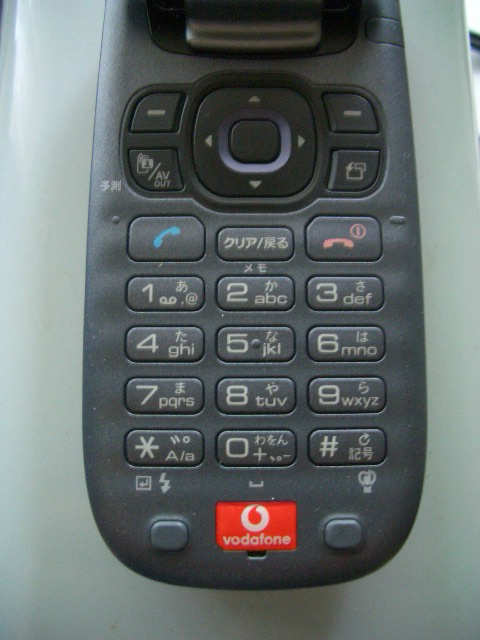
A mobile phone keypad with Latin and Japanese characters.

In the course of telephone history, dials as well as keypads have been associated with various mappings of letters and characters to numbers.

The systems used in the UK, the US, and Australia differed slightly over the placement of O, Q, and Z, but the first system established in Denmark differed radically (1=C 2=ABD 3=EFG 4=HIK 5=LMN 6=OPR 7=STU 8=VXY 9=ÆØ 0=[none]). The use of alphanumeric codes for area codes was abandoned in Europe when international direct dialing was introduced in the 1960s, because, for example, dialing VIC 8900 on a Danish telephone would result in a different number than dialling it on a British telephone. At the same time, letters were no longer placed on the dials or keypads of new telephones.

Letters did not reappear on phones in Europe until the introduction of mobile phones, and the layout followed the new international standard ITU E.161/ISO 9995-8. The ITU established an international standard (ITU E.161) in the mid-1990s, recommended that this should be the layout used on any new devices. There is a standard, ETSI ES 202 130, that covers European languages and other languages used in Europe, published by the independent ETSI organisation in 2003 and updated in 2007. Documentation describing some principles of the standard is available.

Early smartphones such as the Palm Treo, HTC Wizard, and BlackBerry had full alphanumeric keyboards instead of the traditional telephone keypads, and the user had to execute additional steps to dial a number containing convenience letters. On certain BlackBerry devices, a user can press the Alt key followed by the desired letter, and the device will generate the appropriate DTMF tone.

Later smartphones moved to on-screen virtual keyboards and keypads. The latter typically include the ITU standard letters next to each number (and many Android phone use the 1 key to access voicemail and the zero to type a "+").

== See also ==
- E.161 – ITU-T Recommendation for keypads and dials
- Phoneword – Alphanumeric equivalents of telephone numbers
- Rotary dial – Device for sending telephone numbers
- T9 – Mobile phone technology
