= Whitehall 1212 =

Telephone number of Scotland Yard

Whitehall 1212 was the telephone number of Scotland Yard. It was introduced in 1932 (having previously been Victoria 7000) and was used by the public to contact the London Metropolitan Police Service information room for both emergency and non-emergency business. Telephone exchanges had names at the time. In some parts of the country it was possible to dial the first three letters to reach numbers on neighbouring exchanges, so numbers were often published with the first three letters capitalised: "WHItehall 1212". With the introduction of the 999 number for emergencies in 1937, Whitehall 1212 (dialled as WHI 1212 or 944 1212) remained in use for non-emergencies until the 1960s and the introduction of all-figure numbering. The switchboard number for New Scotland Yard has become 020 7230 1212, and the last four digits of the telephone number for several other Metropolitan police buildings are 1212.

Since 2011, the official non-emergency contact number for the Metropolitan Police has been 101. However, 020 7230 1212 is still available as an alternative number.
