= John Karlin =

Industrial psychologist (1918 - 2013)

John Elias Karlin (February 28, 1918 – January 28, 2013) was an industrial psychologist and a pioneer in human factors engineering at Bell Laboratories of AT&T.

As the son of grocers, Karlin was born in Johannesburg, South Africa. He studied at the University of Cape Town, earning a bachelor's degrees in music, philosophy, and psychology, and a master's in psychology. At the same time he was a violinist with the local symphony orchestra and string quartet.

He later moved to the United States, earning a PhD from the University of Chicago and studying electrical engineering at the Massachusetts Institute of Technology.

During World War II Karlin conducted research on psychoacoustics for the United States military. He joined Bell Labs afterwards, becoming their first staff psychologist. He successfully argued for the foundation of its Human Factors Engineering Department in 1947, and was promoted to directorship of the unit in 1951. He undertook numerous empirical research projects, such as the usability of numerical input systems and the human capacity to recall digit sequences. The development of the modern telephone keypad is attributed to research in the 1950s in the department, which was influential in many other applications. Around 1960, his research resulted in the transformation of the telephone numbering plan in use in North America from the use of telephone exchange names to all-number calling (ANC) to provide essential expansion of the pool of available telephone numbers.

Karlin was married twice, and had two children, one of whom predeceased him, and three stepchildren.
