= All-number calling =

Type of telephone numbering plan in North America

All-number calling (ANC) is a telephone numbering plan that was introduced into the North American Numbering Plan by the Bell System in the United States starting in 1958 to replace the previous system of using a telephone exchange name as the first part of a telephone number. The plan prescribed the format of a telephone number assigned to subscriber telephones to consist of ten digits, composed from a three-digit area code, a three-digit central office code, and a four-digit station number. This increased the number of effectively available central office codes in each numbering plan area (NPA) from 540 to 792, thereby staving off the threat of exhausting the number pool, which was forecast to occur by the late 20th century.

== History ==
Bell System mapping of letters to dialed digits
dialed digit	letters
1	
2	A B C
3	D E F
4	G H I
5	J K L
6	M N O
7	P R S
8	T U V
9	W X Y
0	Z

Until the 1950s, a typical telephone number in the United States and many other countries consisted of a telephone exchange name and a four- or five-digit subscriber number. The first two or three letters of the exchange name translated into digits given by a mapping typically displayed on the telephone's rotary dial by grouping the letters around the associated digit. The table (right) shows the typical assignment in the Bell System in use at the time. The letter Q was not used, and Z was translated to 0 (zero) on some dials, albeit never used in the name system. For example, a New Yorker's telephone number might have been CHelsea 2-5034, which a calling telephone subscriber would dial as the digit sequence 2425034, translating C to 2, and H to 4.

After World War II, the newly conceived nationwide numbering plan of 1947 sought to unify all local numbering plans by using a system of two central office letters and one digit to complete the office prefix, and four digits for line number. This system was referred to as 2L-5N, or simply 2-5. This plan was projected to be usable beyond the year 2000. However, with increasing demand for telephone service in the post-war decades, it became apparent by the late 1950s, that the system would be outgrown by about 1975. The limitations for the usable leading digits of central office codes, imposed by using common names for central office names, and their leading two characters as guides for customer dialing could no longer be maintained when opening new central offices. By 1962 it was forecast that in 1985 the number of telephones in the nation would equal its population of 280 million and increase to 600 million telephones for 340 million people in 2000. As a result, the North American telephone administrations first introduced letter combinations that could not be linked to a familiar pronounceable central office name in some highly populated states, such as New York.

The final solution to the growing threat of numbering exhaustion was decided by AT&T engineers and administrators from in-depth studies of all alternative methods. It was decided to eliminate the restrictions of using names and lettered prefixes.

Partitioning of the NANP prefix space under all-number-calling
000 — 099	These 200 codes were used as toll center and system codes		
100 — 199	These 200 codes were used as toll center and system codes		
area codes	service codes	area codes	central office codes
200 — 210	211	212 — 219	220 — 299
300 — 310	311	312 — 319	320 — 399
400 — 410	411	412 — 419	420 — 499
500 — 510	511	512 — 519	520 — 599
600 — 610	611	612 — 619	620 — 699
700 — 710	711	712 — 719	720 — 799
800 — 810	811	812 — 819	820 — 899
900 — 910	911	912 — 919	920 — 999
152 area codes 8 special service codes			640 CO codes

This goal had been envisioned internally within AT&T for some time. In 1954, John Karlin directed a research project that investigated the memory capacity and dialing accuracy of employees when using seven-digit telephone numbers comprising only digits. At that time, some directory publishing departments also began removing the entire central office name from telephone directories, preferring to only list the dialed letters of the prefix. The practice did not produce any adverse effects, and opened the path for listing telephone numbers in the 2-5 style, where the two letters were unrelated to any pronounceable name.

Under all-number calling, the number of permissible central office prefixes increased from 540 to potentially 800, but the first two digits of the central office code were still restricted to the range 2 to 9, and the eight combinations that ended in 11 were reserved as special calling codes. This increased the numbering pool for central office codes to 640, and resulted in the partitioning of the prefix space (000—999) according to the table at the right.

All-number calling was first field-tested in Wichita Falls, Texas, starting on January 19, 1958, with the installation of a new dial exchange. The results indicated a substantial reduction of dialing errors over new system installations that used the 2-5 numbering system.

In small communities the new system was met with little resistance. In Council Bluffs, Iowa, with roughly 26,000 telephone subscribers, it also caused no major resistance in March 1960. During larger scale introductions in California in 1962, this change sparked an intense outcry among urban users who considered all-digit dialing to be dehumanizing.

In 1961, AT&T made an instructional video called Mr. Digit and the Battle of Bubbling Brook, starring Peg Lynch and Alan Bunce as Ethel and Albert, along with an uncredited Howard McNear as the voice of Mr. Digit, explaining the necessity of all-number calling.

Karlin, the inventor of the all-number system, stated that he had been approached by a woman at a cocktail party, "Are you the John Karlin who is responsible for all-number dialing?" He proudly replied, "Yes, I am." She then asked him, "How does it feel to be the most hated man in America?" Opponents created a variety of organizations to oppose all-number calling, including the Anti-Digit Dialing League and the Committee of Ten Million to Oppose All-Number Calling to pressure AT&T to drop the plan.

Other countries introduced similar transitions for eliminating exchange names. In the United Kingdom, the new system was known as all-figure dialling.

== See also ==
- Rotary dial
- E.161 ITU-T recommendation
