= Viewdata =

Information retrieval service and legacy system

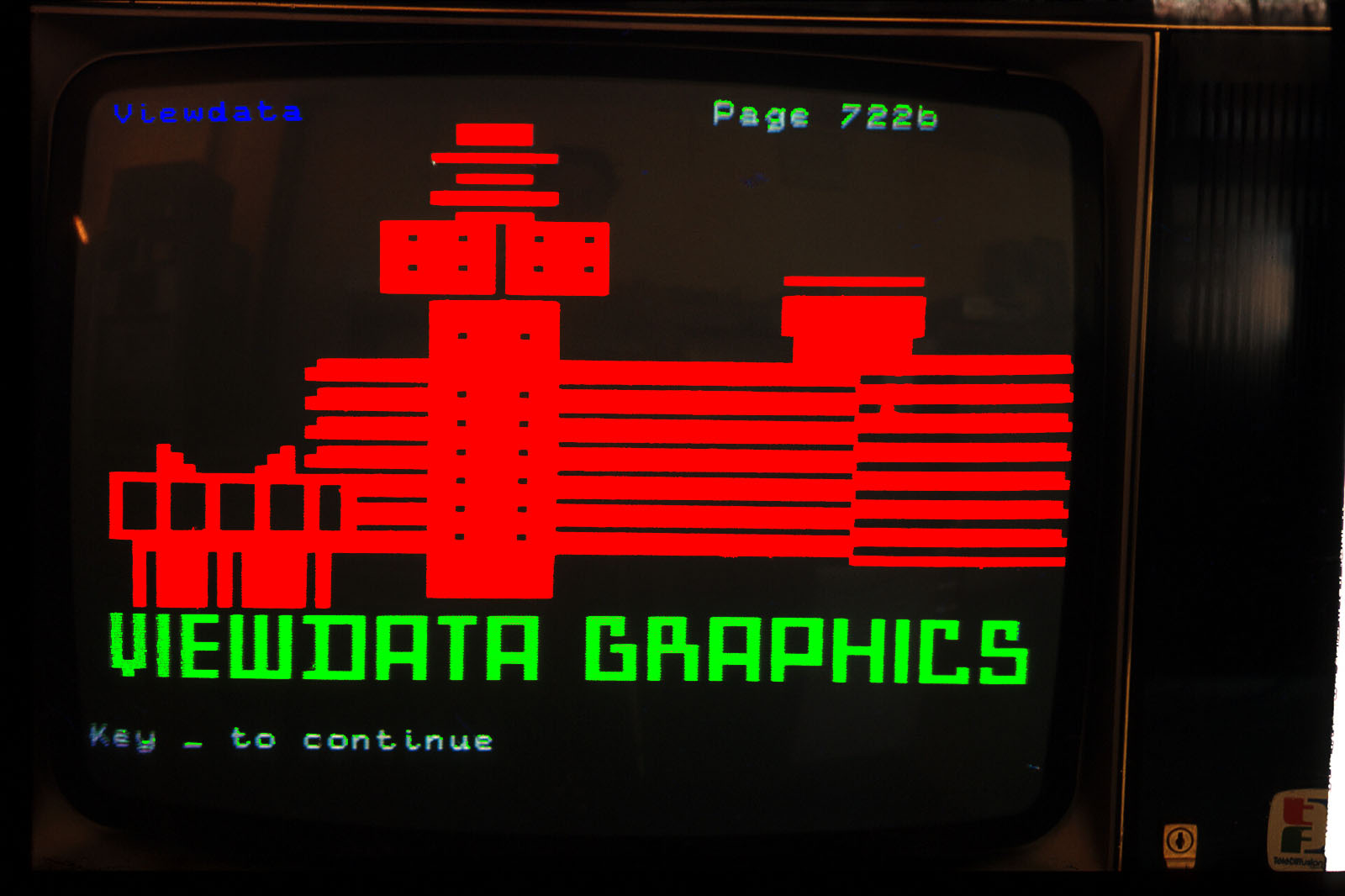
- Viewdata Graphics used in the experimental phone directory of Post Office Telecommunications in 1977. The image is a graphical representation of the Post Office/British Telecom Research laboratories (Adastral Park) in Suffolk, England. Note the "_ to continue" rather than the correct "⌗ to continue", showing a common rendering error.
- Developer: Samuel Fedida, Post Office
- Type: Videotex
- Launched: 1974; 52 years ago
- Platform: Viewdata

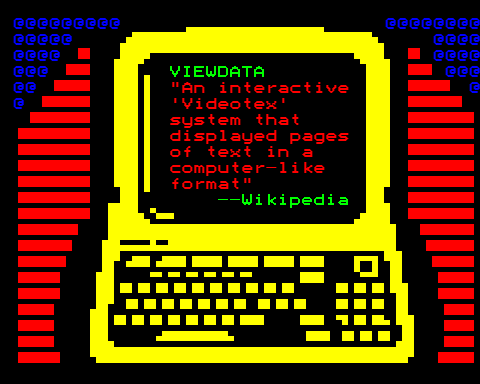
A Viewdata machine displayed in teletext format

Viewdata is a Videotex implementation. It is a type of information retrieval service in which a subscriber can access a remote database via a common carrier channel, request data and receive requested data on a video display over a separate channel. Samuel Fedida, who had the idea for Viewdata in 1968, was credited as inventor of the system which was developed while working for the British Post Office which was the operator of the national telephone system. The first prototype became operational in 1974. The access, request and reception are usually via common carrier broadcast channels. This is in contrast with teletext.

== Design ==
Viewdata offered a display of 40×24 characters, based on ISO 646 (IRV IA5) – 7 bits with no accented characters. Originally, Viewdata was accessed with a special purpose terminal (or emulation software) and a modem running at ITU-T V.23 speed (1,200 bit/s down, 75 bit/s up). By 2004, it was normally accessed over TCP/IP using Viewdata client software on a personal computer running Microsoft Windows, or using a Web-based emulator.

=== Keypad symbols: the sextile and the square ===
⌗ ⚹o

Viewdata keypad symbols
- In Unicode: U+2317 ⌗ VIEWDATA SQUARE; U+26B9 ⚹ SEXTILE

Different from
- Different from: U+002A * ASTERISK (&ast;, &midast;); U+0023 # NUMBER SIGN (&num;)

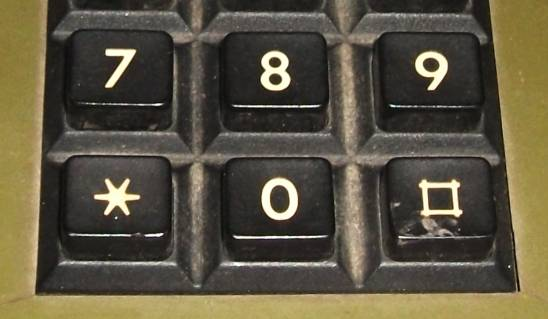
Detail of a telephone keypad displaying the sextile and Viewdata square

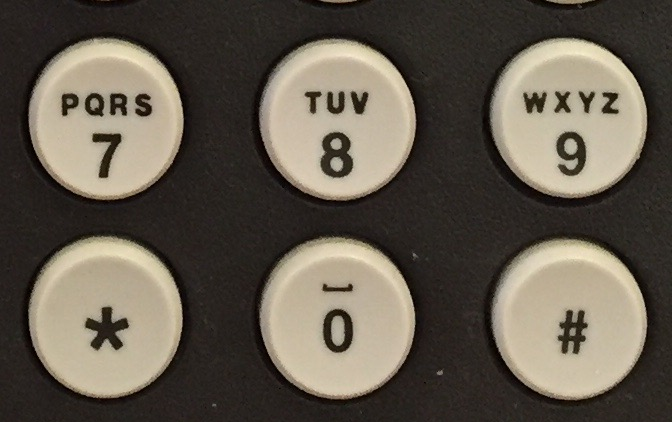
Detail of a more recent telephone keypad, in which (typographic) asterisk and number sign have replaced the ITU star and square

Viewdata uses special symbols already widely available on telephone keypads: the ⚹ "star key" and the ⌗ "square key", as formally recommended by the International Telecommunication Union. The ASCII asterisk (*) and number sign (#) are sometimes used instead because they are regular symbols on computer keyboards, although they do not match the ITU specification. On telephones, use of the number sign (hash symbol) has become the norm rather than the exception.

These symbols appear as U+26B9 ⚹ SEXTILE and U+2317 ⌗ VIEWDATA SQUARE in the Miscellaneous Symbols and Miscellaneous Technical Unicode blocks, respectively. The sextile was added due to its use in astrology, and the square had previously appeared in the BS_Viewdata character set, as a replacement for the underscore.

In 2013, the German national body submitted a Unicode Technical Committee proposal to align the Unicode reference glyphs with the ITU specifications for these symbols, and annotate them as telephone keypad symbols on the code charts. As of 2019 (Unicode 12.1), these changes have not been accepted/implemented.

== Uses ==
=== Travel industry ===
As of 2015, Viewdata was still in use in the United Kingdom, mainly by the travel industry. Travel agents use it to look up the price and availability of package holidays and flights. Once they find what the customer is looking for they can place a booking. As of 2019, Viewdata is only used by a handful of travel agents.

=== Bulletin board systems ===
A number of Viewdata bulletin board systems existed in the 1980s, predominantly in the UK due to the proliferation of the BBC Micro, and a short-lived Viewdata Revival appeared in the late 1990s fuelled by the retrocomputing vogue. Some Viewdata boards still exist, with accessibility in the form of Java Telnet clients.

== See also ==
- Prestel
