= Samuel Fedida =

English inventor and businessman

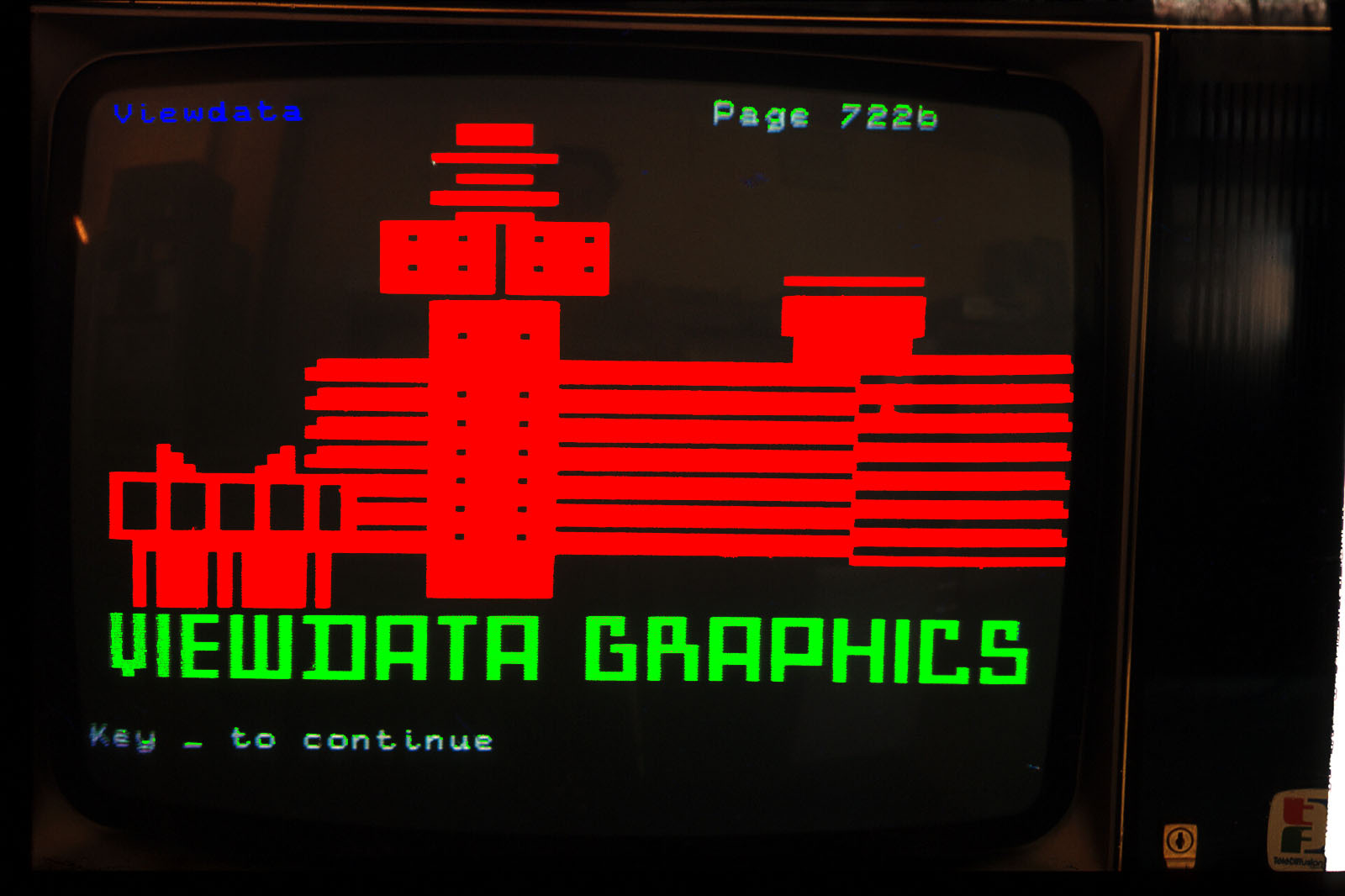
Viewdata Graphics used in the experimental phone directory of Post Office Telecommunications in 1977. The image is a graphical representation of the Post Office/British Telecom Research laboratories (Adastral Park) in Suffolk, England.

Samuel Fedida, OBE (4 May 1918 – 10 August 2007) was an Egyptian-born British telecommunication engineer responsible at Post Office Telecommunications for the development of Viewdata.

Fedida was born in Alexandria, Egypt. He had the idea for Viewdata in 1968 after reading a publication with the title The Computer as Communications Device. The first prototype became operational in 1974. In 1977 the system was introduced in the United Kingdom. He was appointed an Officer of the Order of the British Empire in the 1980 Birthday Honours.

The book Viewdata Revolution authored by Fedida and Rex Malik, ISBN 0852272146, was published in 1979.

He died in 2007 in Hemel Hempstead.

== Sources ==
- "Patent: Information handling system and terminal apparatus therefore". Archived from the original on 10 July 2012.
- "US-Gericht sieht in Nutzung von Hyperlinks keine Patentrechtsverletzung" (in German).
- Eric Somers (May 1983). "A user's view of Prestel". Creative Computing. 9 (5): 123.
- "Fanfare for Prestel".
- "A Short History of Prestel".
- Infoworld Media Group, Inc (1982). "Prestel: gateway to world of electronic communication". InfoWorld: 9.
- Infoworld Media Group, Inc (1979). "Viewdata '80 To show Many Teletext Systems". InfoWorld: 3.
- Otfried Georg. – 2., völlig neubearb. und erw. Aufl. (2000). Telekommunikationstechnik: Handbuch für Praxis und Lehre. Berlin: Springer. p. 28. ISBN 978-3-540-66845-9.
- James Gillies & Robert Cailliau (2000). How the Web was born: the story of the World Wide Web. Oxford: Oxford University Press. p. 106. ISBN 978-0-19-286207-5.
