= 井 =

井 (pinyin: jǐng) is a Chinese word for well. It may also mean:

- Jing (surname)
- Well (Chinese constellation)
- I Ching hexagram 48
- One of the 20 kanji added to the kyoiku kanji in 2020 since it is in the name of Fukui Prefecture (福井県, Fukui-ken)

See also:

- the well-field system (Chinese: 井田制度; pinyin: jǐngtián zhìdù) a Chinese system of land distribution, so named due to its geometric resemblance to the character 井
