= Sextile =

Symbol used in astrology and telephony

⚹

Sextile
- In Unicode: U+26B9 ⚹ SEXTILE

Different from
- Different from: U+002A * ASTERISK

Related
- See also: U+26BA ⚺ SEMISEXTILE; U+FF0A ＊ FULLWIDTH ASTERISK; U+1F7B5 🞵 LIGHT SIX SPOKED ASTERISK

The sextile is an aspect in Astrology, a symbol to represent that aspect, and a typographical symbol used in telephony. The symbol represents the radii of a hexagon.

== Astrology ==
Sextile astrological symbol, E.161 "figure 2"

In astrology, a sextile aspect is one of 60º, which is 1/6 of the 360° ecliptic or 1/2 a trine (120°). Depending on the involved planets, an orb of 4-5° is allowed.

== Other uses ==
The more notable of the other uses of the symbol are as a star key on a telephone keypad and on a Viewdata keyboard. This usage first appeared in a 1973 US patent filing (3,920,926). Early prototypes of the touch-tone telephone used keys with a star and diamond shape. According to Bell engineer Doug Kerr, these were replaced with the sextile and octothorpe because those could be typed or approximated with the ASCII character set or an office typewriter.

== See also ==
- French Republican calendar, in which a leap year was called sextile
- Star (grapheme) § Six points
