= All-figure dialling =

Telephone numbering plan in the United Kingdom

All-figure dialling was a telephone numbering plan introduced in the United Kingdom starting in 1966 that replaced the traditional system of using initial letters of telephone exchange names as the first part of a telephone number. The change affected subscriber numbers in the cities of Birmingham, Edinburgh, Glasgow, Liverpool, London and Manchester which used the Director telephone system.

The transition to all-figure dialling occurred between 1966 and 1970 and was initiated by the General Post Office. It was one of the first in a series of changes in the organisation of British telephone numbers. In most areas the change initially only affected the presentation of area codes, but in six multiple exchange director areas such as the London telephone area, the change required the introduction of new local exchange codes. The period of parallel operation of the old and new systems ended in 1970 with the ANN: All-figure Numbers Now advertising campaign. The changes were required for the continued good operation of the telephone service, but were considered controversial at the time. They occurred because of the increase in subscriber-dialled international calls from countries which used a different mapping of letters to numbers on the rotary dial and because the number of useful exchange mnemonics that were possible under the existing system was being exhausted. The implementation of all-figure dialling and new local exchange codes in director areas allowed changes to be made to routing of calls into and out of these areas.

== Background ==
In six metropolitan areas around major cities, groups of multiple exchanges operated in a director telephone system. The six cities were Birmingham, Edinburgh, Glasgow, Liverpool, London and Manchester. In these areas the first three digits of the seven digit subscriber number was presented as letters chosen to represent the local exchange within the director area. The letters and numbers corresponded as follows:

| 1 | 2 | 3 | 4 | 5 | 6 | 7 | 8 | 9 | 0 |
|---|---|---|---|---|---|---|---|---|---|
| | ABC | DEF | GHI | JKL | MN | PRS | TUV | WXY | OQ |

For example, in the London telephone area a subscriber number on the Wimbledon exchange was presented WIM 1234 and dialled as 946 1234. These local exchange codes (introduced in London in 1927) predated the introduction of STD codes by several decades.

The General Post Office issued subscriber trunk dialling (STD) codes for most areas during the late 1950s and early 1960s. The codes allowed subscribers to call other exchanges directly and without the assistance of an operator. To help the public remember the new codes they were represented by a recognisable combination of two letters and a number.

Outside the director areas, at least three character codes were dialled after an initial '0' which gave trunk access. For example, the code for Bath was BA5, which was dialled as 0225. The rotary dial included the corresponding letters next to the appropriate digits.

== Problems ==
The continued operation of the system presented a number of problems. As STD was expanded to non-director areas, every telephone which had been issued with no letters on the dials needed to be altered for alphanumeric dialling. With the growth of subscriber dialled international calls from abroad and the incompatible allocation of letters to numbers on foreign dials, there was an increase in the number of dialling errors. In London the number of three letter codes that could be used to represent exchanges had been exhausted. Significant changes were planned to the way calls in and out of the London telephone area were to be handled that required exchange codes to be grouped together into sectors and it was not possible to implement these changes without a transition to all-figure dialling. The General Post Office produced a pamphlet All-Figure Telephone Numbers in 1965 which summarised the problems.

== Changes ==
From 1966, UK telephone dialling codes ceased to be represented with letters. In most areas this did not require any changes to the telephone codes or numbers, e.g. the Sevenoaks STD code changed from 0SE2 to its numerical equivalent 0732. However, in Director telephone areas such as the London telephone area, the changes permitted many new exchange codes to be issued that did not correspond to letters representing the geographic locations. As '1' was also available for the 'B' and 'C' digits, this allowed many more exchange codes such as 211, 212, 221 to be used. At the same time, many local exchange codes were altered in order to group them into geographic sectors (e.g. GROsvenor became 499 rather than 470) to eliminate the need for all incoming calls to be routed via central London.

In the Director areas the old codes continued to work in parallel with new codes until 1970 when the "ANN: All-figure Numbers Now" advertising campaign prompted callers to dial only the new codes. By October 1969 in Edinburgh 79% of calls were being made using the new local exchange codes, in London 72% and in Glasgow 43%. London was the first to withdraw the ability to dial the old codes in January 1970 and from April the parallel operation was withdrawn in the other five cities.

The change to all-figure dialling was controversial and was debated in both Houses of Parliament. Among the criticisms of the new system was the perceived difficulty in remembering telephone numbers, the inability to easily recognise where a telephone number was located and the need for a change so soon after the implementation of subscriber trunk dialling.

== See also ==
- All-number calling, the United States equivalent.
