= Telephone exchange names =

Alphanumeric telephone numbering plan

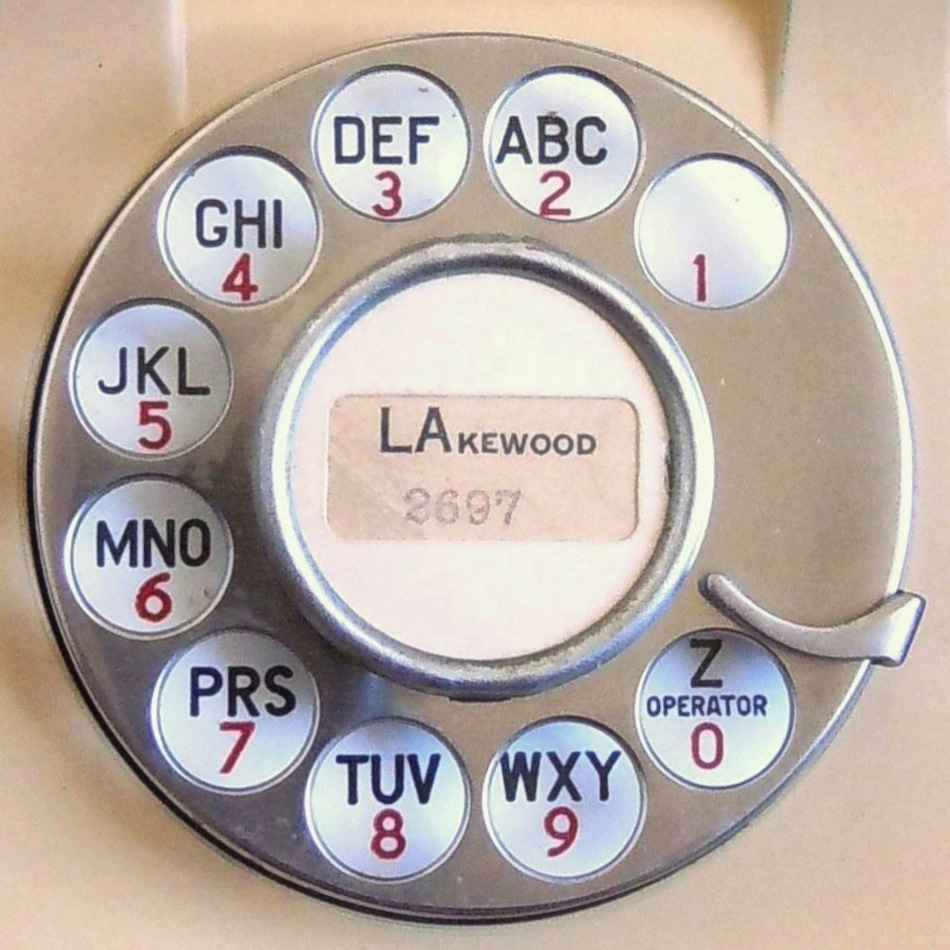
Face of a 1939 rotary dial showing the telephone number LA-2697, which includes the first two letters of Lakewood, New Jersey

Educational film produced by Bell which explains the correct use of a dial telephone, using WOrth 4-9970 as an example number

A telephone exchange name or central office name was a distinguishing and memorable name assigned to a central office. It identified the switching system to which a telephone was connected, and facilitated the connection of telephone calls between switching systems in different localities.

While small towns and rural areas might each be served by a single exchange, large cities were served by multiple switching systems, either distributed in the community constituting multiple exchange areas, or sometimes hosted in the same building to serve a densely populated area. Central offices were usually identified by names that were locally significant. The leading letters of a central office name were used as the leading components of the telephone number representation, so that each telephone number in the area was unique. These letters were mapped to the digits of the dial, which was indicated visibly on the dial's numbering plate.

Several systematic telephone numbering plans existed in various communities, typically evolving over time as the subscriber base outgrew older numbering schemes. A widely used numbering plan was a system of using one or two letters from the central office name with four or five digits. Such systems were designated as 2L-4N or 2L-5N, or simply 2–4 and 2–5, respectively, but some large cities initially selected plans with three letters (3L-4N). In 1917, W. G. Blauvelt of AT&T proposed a mapping system that displayed three letters each with the digits 2 through 9 on the dial.

Telephone directories or other telephone number displays, such as in advertising, typically listed the telephone number showing the significant letters of the central office name in bold capital letters, followed by the digits that identified the subscriber line. On the number card of the telephone instrument, the name was typically shown in full, but only the significant letters to be dialed were capitalized, while the rest of the name was shown in lower case.

Telephone exchange names were used in many countries, but were phased out in favor of numeric systems in the 1960s. In the United States, the demand for telephone service outpaced the scalability of the alphanumeric system and after introduction of area codes for direct-distance dialing, all-number calling became necessary. Similar developments followed around the world, such as the British all-figure dialling.

== Background ==
This mid- to late-1950s telephone dial displays the name of telephone exchange Kenmore, in the South Side of Fort Wayne, Indiana. The telephone number of this station is K-9293. Since the letter K is emboldened, it was a required component of the telephone number, dialed as the digit 5, as the red lettering indicates.

In the early, small telephone networks, it was customary to initiate a connection to another subscriber by requesting the name of the desired party from the operator. While this method persisted into the 1920s in very small communities, growth of the business soon made this impractical, and subscriber stations were assigned telephone numbers. Single exchanges (central offices) were typically named after the municipality or location, so that calls to another town could be easily identified. Cities soon needed additional branch offices some distance from Central, to accommodate the subscriber base and expanding area, as a single office typically served a maximum of ten thousand telephone numbers. Often, additional central offices might be named by the directions of the compass, North, South, East, and West. But many cities chose other naming schemes, using locally significant names of districts, parks, or other well-known features, such as Market. A caller would request a connection to Market 1234, for example. The selection of central office names was conducted in a careful manner to avoid misunderstanding of the verbal requests.

For automatic telephone service, impulse senders (dials) were installed on customer telephones, so that subscribers did not need operators to initiate a call, but simply dial the directory number themselves. This required a digit or letter identification of central offices, so that the central office for the recipient could be dialed before the line number. Telephone dials were typically supplemented with letters next to the numerals on the dial, as seen in the accompanying photo, so that a name could be dialed by its first letter, or by multiple letters.

== United States and Canada ==
Telephone numbers listed in 1920 in New York City having three-letter exchange prefixes

In the United States, the most-populous cities, such as New York City, Philadelphia, Boston, and Chicago, initially implemented dial service with telephone numbers consisting of three letters and four digits (3L-4N) according to a system developed by W. G. Blauvelt of AT&T in 1917. This system mapped letters of the alphabet to digits on the telephone dial. In 1930, New York City converted to a 2L-5N telephone numbering plan. Most other major Canadian and US cities, such as Toronto and Atlanta, were converted from manual exchanges using four digits to a 2L-4N numbering plan. For example, in Montréal, ATwater 1234 was dialed as six pulls on the dial (AT1234) to send the digit sequence 281234. Eventually, starting in the late 1940s, all local numbering plans were changed to the 2L-5N system to prepare for nationwide Operator Toll Dialing. For example, under this system, a well-known number in New York City was listed as PEnnsylvania 6-5000.

In small towns with a single central office, local calls typically required dialing only four digits at most. A toll call required the assistance of an operator, who asked for the name of the town and the station number. Some independent telephone companies, not part of the Bell System, also did not implement central office names.

In 1915, newly developed panel switching systems were tested in the Mulberry and Waverly exchanges in Newark, New Jersey. When the technology first appeared in the Mulberry exchange, subscriber telephones had no dials, and placing a call required no change for subscribers—they asked an operator to ring their called party as usual. The operator keyed the number into the panel equipment, instead of making cord connections manually. The panel switch was later, from the early 1920s through the 1930s, installed in large metropolitan areas in the Bell System. By the 1950s twenty cities were served by this type of office.

Several representations of telephone numbers using central office names capitalized and emboldened the leading letters that were dialed, for example:

- **K**enmore 9392 is a five-pull (1L-4N) small-city telephone number for the Kenmore exchange in Fort Wayne, Indiana.
- **MA**rket 7032 is a six-digit (2L-4N) telephone number. This format was in use from the 1920s through the 1950s, and was phased out c. 1960.
- **BAL**dwin 6828 is an urban 3L-4N example, used only in the largest cities before conversion to two-letter central office names.
- **EN**glewood 3-1234 is an example of the 2L-5N format, gradually implemented continent-wide starting in the 1940s, in preparation for DDD.
- **MU**rray Hill 5-9975 is another example of the 2L-5N format, one of the Ricardos' numbers on I Love Lucy. The H in Hill, although not dialed, is still capitalized, but not emboldened, as the first letter of the second word.

In print, such as on business cards or in advertisements, the central office name was often shown only by two letters:

- TEmpleton 1-6400 would often appear as TE 1-6400.

If the central office was known by a name, but no letters were dialed, it was common to capitalize only the first letter of the central office without emboldening the first letter, e.g., Main 600W or Fairmont 33. Such numbers were assigned typically in manual offices, and the name would be spoken by a subscriber when requesting a destination. Often these were geographically significant names, such as the town's name.

Telephone number card of c.1948 with the local telephone number 4-5876 in Atlantic City, NJ, using the central office prefix 4. It was later converted to AT4 to produce a 2L-5N telephone number.

In large cities with coexisting manual and dial areas, the numbering was generally standardized to one format. For example, when the last manual exchange in San Francisco was converted to dial in 1953, the numbers had for several years been in the format of JUniper 6-5833. JUniper 4 was an automatic switching system, but JUniper 6 was manual. To call JUniper 6 from JUniper 4, the subscriber dialed the number and it was displayed to the B-board operator at JUniper 6, and that operator would complete the connection manually. In the other direction, to call JUniper 4 from JUniper 6, the subscriber would lift the receiver and speak to the JUniper 6 operator who would in turn dial the JUniper 4 number.

In the 1940s, the Bell System developed the nationwide telephone number plan for Operator Toll Dialing, a system of initially eighty-six numbering plan areas (NPAs) that were assigned the first set of area codes. These were used at first only by switchboard operators to route trunk calls between numbering plan areas, but were the foundation for the North American Numbering Plan, The 2L-5N system for the local directory number became the North American standard Direct long-distance dialing by customers, using the three-digit area code and a seven-digit telephone number, commenced in the 1950s.

During the 1950s, cities still using five or six-digit numbers converted to the new method of seven-digit dialing. Typically, several six-digit (2L-4N) exchanges were co-located in one building already, with new ones added as old ones had filled up. After the conversion, they may have been combined into a new 2L-5N exchange area. For example, the CHerry, FIllmore, ATwater, and KLondike exchanges might be converted to OXford 1, 3, 6, and 7. Usually customers would keep the same station numbers.

When mobile radio telephone service was offered, some telephone companies used letters based on various prefixes for unit identifiers (e.g. JL6-1212), or to identify radio channels (e.g. channel JR).

=== Standardization ===
U.S. Mapping of letters to dialed digits in the 1950s
dialed digit	letters
1	
2	A B C
3	D E F
4	G H I
5	J K L
6	M N O
7	P R S
8	T U V
9	W X Y
0	Z

In the early 1950s, AT&T established a list of recommended exchange names that were the result of studies to minimize misunderstandings when spoken. The recommendation was intended for newly established exchanges, and did not mandate the renaming of existing historical names. The number sequences 55, 57x, 95x, and 97x had no exchange names specified, as the mappings for the digits 5, 7, and 9 had no vowels, thus making it difficult to find names with those consonant combinations. As a result, those numbers were very seldom assigned to exchanges. However, KLondike was used for 55x in San Francisco and Columbus, Ohio, and WRigley 5 (975) in Chicago (Wrigley Field). On the telephone dial, letters were mapped to digits using the assignments shown in the table (right).

The following is AT&T's recommended list of central office names as published in 1955, sorted by the first two digits of the three-digit central office code.

Numerical prefix	Recommended central office names (1955)
22	ACademy, BAldwin, CAnal, CApital, CAstle
23	ADams, BElmont, BEverly, CEdar, CEnter, CEntral
24	CHapel, CHerry, CHestnut, CHurchill, CIrcle
25	ALpine, BLackburn, CLearbrook, CLearwater, CLifford, CLinton
26	AMherst, ANdrew, COlfax, COlony, COngress
27	BRidge, BRoad(way), BRown(ing), CRestview, CRestwood
28	ATlantic, ATlas, ATwater, ATwood, AVenue, BUtler
29	AXminster, AXtel, CYpress
32	DAvenport, DAvis, EAst(gate), FAculty, FAirfax, FAirview
33	DEerfield, DEwey, EDgewater, EDgewood, EDison, FEderal
34	DIamond, DIckens, FIeldbrook, FIeldstone, FIllmore, FIrestone
35	ELgin, ELliot, ELmwood, FLanders, FLeetwood
36	EMerson, EMpire, ENdicott, FOrest, FOxcroft
37	DRake, DRexel, ESsex, FRanklin, FRontier
38	DUdley, DUnkirk, DUpont, EVergreen, FUlton
39	EXbrook, EXeter, EXport, EXpress
42	GArden, GArfield, HAmilton, HArrison, HAzel
43	GEneral, GEneva, HEmlock, HEmpstead, IDlewood
44	GIbson, GIlbert, HIckman, HIckory, HIllcrest, HIlltop
45	GLadstone, GLencourt, GLendale, GLenview, GLobe
46	HObart, HOmestead, HOpkins, HOward, INgersoll
47	GRanite, GReenfield, GReenleaf, GReenwood, GRidley, GRover
48	HUbbard, HUdson, HUnter, HUntley, HUxley, IVanhoe
49	GYpsy, HYacinth, HYatt
52	JAckson, LAfayette, LAkeside, LAkeview, LAmbert, LAwrence
53	JEfferson, KEllogg, KEystone, LEhigh, LEnox
54	KImball, KIngsdale, KIngswood, LIberty, LIncoln, LInden
56	JOhn, JOrdan, LOcust, LOgan, LOwell
58	JUniper, JUno, JUstice, LUdlow, LUther
59	LYceum, LYndhurst, LYnwood, LYric
62	MAdison, MAin, MArket, MAyfair, NAtional
63	MEdford, MElrose, MErcury, NEptune, NEwton, NEwtown
64	MIdway, MIlton, MIssion, MItchell, NIagara
65	OLdfield, OLive, OLiver, OLympia, OLympic
66	MOhawk, MOntrose, MOrris, NOrmandy, NOrth(field)
67	ORange, ORchard, ORiole, ORleans, OSborne
68	MUrdock, MUrray, MUseum, MUtual, OVerbrook, OVerland
69	MYrtle, OWen, OXbow, OXford
72	PAlace, PArk(view), PArk(way), RAndolph, RAymond, SAratoga
73	PEnnsylvania, PErshing, REd(field), REd(wood), REgent, REpublic
74	PIlgrim, PIoneer, RIver(side), RIver(view), SHadyside, SHerwood
75	PLateau, PLaza, PLeasant, PLymouth, SKyline
76	POplar, POrter, ROckwell, ROger(s), SOuth(field)
77	PRescott, PResident, PRospect, SPring, SPruce
78	STate, STerling, STillwell, STory, SUffolk, SUnset,
79	PYramid, SWarthmore, SWift, SWinburne, SYcamore
82	TAlbot, TAlmadge, TAylor, VAlley, VAndyke
83	TEmple(ton), TEnnyson, TErminal, TErrace, VErnon
84	THornwall, TIlden, VIctor(ia), VIking, VInewood
85	ULrick, ULster, ULysses
86	TOwnsend, UNderhill, UNion, UNiversity, VOlunteer
87	TRemont, TRiangle, TRinity, TRojan, UPtown
88	TUcker, TUlip, TUrner, TUxedo
89	TWilight, TWinbrook, TWining, TWinoaks
92	WAbash, WAlker, WAlnut, WArwick, WAverly
93	WEbster, WEllington, WElls, WEst(more), YEllowstone
94	WHitehall, WHitney, WIlliam(s), WIlson, WIndsor
96	WOodland, WOodlawn, WOodward, WOrth, YOrktown
98	YUkon
99	WYandotte, WYman, WYndown

The letters Q and Z were never used in the naming system, but Z was often mapped on the telephone dial to the digit 0 (zero). The prefix 55 was set aside for fictitious telephone numbers of the form 555-XXXX. They were often used with the fictitious exchange name KLondike (55).

=== All-number calling ===
As demand for telephone service grew in the post–World War II period, it was foreseeable that the demand would exceed the addressing capacity of the existing system of using memorable telephone central office names as prefixes in telephone numbers. Several letter combinations had no pronounceable or memorable names and could not be used. Several North American numbering plan areas (NPAs) were divided so that more office codes became available to smaller regions. However, as the growth accelerated, the Bell System decided to implement all-number calling (ANC) and to deprecate the use of central office names to provide more central office codes to each NPA. This extended the usable numbering plan and only two area code splits became necessary between 1962 and 1981. All-number calling was phased in starting in 1958 and most areas had adopted it fully by the mid-1960s. In some areas it did not become universal until the 1980s. The Bell System published and distributed area code handbooks yearly which compiled the towns available for calling using an area code.

Experiencing significant resistance to all-number calling in many areas, the Bell System employed a strategy of gradual changes to ease the transition for customers, and employed media productions to explain the need and process of change to the public. Originally, directory listings had been printed with the central office name spelled out in full. In the first stage of the conversion only the dialed letters were printed, as illustrated in this example:

Subscriber	Original listing	Abbreviated listing
Jones John 123 Anystreet	**BU**tterfield 5-1212	**BU** 5-1212
Jones Paul 5 Revolution Rd	**AN**drew 3-2368	**AN** 3-2368

At this stage, telephone companies had the means to assign letter combinations for central office prefixes that were previously unavailable, thus any set of five- or fewer-digit numbers could be expanded to seven digits, without naming conflicts. Finally, all central office codes were converted to a numerical format, as in the last column of this table:

Subscriber	Alphanumeric coding	All-number calling
Ramsay Betty 12 Connecticut Rd	**LT** 1-5225	581-5225

The Bell System proceeded to convert named exchanges to all-number calling, starting in smaller communities. No significant opposition arose until conversion began in major cities. In some cities such as San Francisco, opposition was organized; the opposition group in San Francisco was called the Anti Digit Dialing League, of which S. I. Hayakawa was a notable member. The opposition caused AT&T to slow the conversion process, and names continued to be used in cities such as New York, which went to ANC only in 1978. Philadelphia had named exchanges in the Bell of Pennsylvania telephone book as late as 1983, long after AT&T had hoped to complete the conversion.

Bell Canada, Alberta Government Telephones, and BC Tel completed most conversions of existing numbers during the first half of the 1960s. In Toronto, historically 2L+4N before numbers were lengthened to accommodate the 1957 introduction of direct distance dialling, the March 1966 directory had no exchange names. Typically in larger communities, conversions would be timed with issues of the telephone directory.

For example, in London, Ontario, three conversions took place starting in February 1962 and completing in September 1963. GEneral 2, 3, and 9 were converted first; later GLadstone 1 and 5, and finally GEneral 4 and 8. An example from Montreal, Quebec, extended from 2L+4N to 2L+5N on August 4, 1957: WIlbank became WEllington 2, WEllington became WEllington 3 (a rare example of keeping the exchange name), FItzroy became WEllington 5, GLenview became WEllington 7, VEndome became DUpont 7, HEmlock became POntiac 7, TRenmore became POntiac 8, HArbour became VIctor 5, and MArquette became VIctor 9.

The use of letters in exchange names resulted in the placement of letters on the telephone dial, even outside the areas using the letter and number combinations. Some Canadian areas at first used original letter schemes, notably Calgary, Alberta, until later standardization within North America. Québec exchange names differed from those on standard Bell System lists due to the need for names in the French language; Hull, Quebec's 77x (PR as in PRovince) needed to be recognizable in both languages in 1957.

In smaller communities with four- or five-digit numbers and a single city exchange, central office names appeared for the first time in the late 1950s, and then solely to match the North American direct distance dial standard of a three-digit area code and seven-digit local number. The names, usually chosen from standard Bell System lists, had no local significance and were short-lived; phase-out began soon after 1960.

== European numbering plans ==
U.K. Dial mapping of letters to digits until A.F.N.
dialed digit	letters
1	
2	A B C
3	D E F
4	G H I
5	J K L
6	M N
7	P R S
8	T U V
9	W X Y
0	O Q

Virtually every telephone exchange in Europe was named after a single village, town, or city but sometimes a geographical feature (e.g. The Lizard) or region (e.g. Scillonia for the Isles of Scilly) would be used for rural areas. In the largest cities it was clear as early as the 1880s that several exchanges would be needed. These were usually given names reflecting a district of a city, for example, in the U.K., Holborn in London, Docks in Manchester, Leith in Edinburgh, or in some cases an apparently entirely unrelated name, e.g., Acorn or Advance in London, Pyramid in Manchester, and Midland in Birmingham. Conflicts were resolved by choosing alternate names. For example, ACTon (Oak Town) would have clashed with BATtersea; its exchange was named ACOrn because of the acorns shown on its Coat of Arms. ADVance was originally BEThnal Green but was renamed (identical pulls of the dial) because many tailors were based there to reduce their overheads, but men's outfitters in the West End did not want their expensive suits showing labels referring to an East End area, which they considered unfashionable.

As automated systems were introduced starting in the late 1920s, the first three letters of these names were used in the numbering plans for those exchanges. The 3L-4N system was notably used in the capital cities Paris and London, both examples of the big-city problem. Large cities served by many manual exchanges could only be converted to automatic operation gradually, which required a logistics of operating both types simultaneously for several years.

Telephone directories for these cities showed the first three letters of the exchange in bold capital letters, when all seven digits were to be dialed. For example, a subscriber number for Scotland Yard on London's Whitehall exchange was shown as "WHItehall 1212".

If the first three letters were capitalized but not bolded, e.g., HAYes 1295, the caller would dial the first three letters only, and when connected to Hayes ask the operator for the local number. Later, Coded Call Indicator working equipment was installed at some manual exchanges so that the caller could dial all seven digits, and the required number would be displayed to the operator.

In the United Kingdom, the first Director exchange in London, Holborn Tandem, was cutover in 1927; preceded by any necessary changes in the London area, e.g. changing some exchange names and making all local numbers 4N (4-digit). As each digit is represented by three letters, the same network normally cannot have exchanges named BRIxton and CRIcklewood, which both correspond to 274. However, London had a few examples (e.g. DREadnought/FREmantle, DUKe/FULham, LEYtonstone/KEYstone) typically because the exchange served a district away from the geographic area or the numbers were used in exhibition centres.

As new exchanges were added, it often became difficult to accommodate geographic names, so that names of locally relevant features and people were used. This included flowers/trees (BLUbell, JUNiper, LABurnham, MULberry, POLlards), artists, writers, military and other historical people (BYRon, MACaulay, TOWnley), structures (CLOcktower, FOUntain), factories (LIBerty, ANVil), topography (BYWood, HILlside, MOUntview, RIVerside, UNDerhill).

In smaller director areas, such as Edinburgh, some A-digit levels were combined, so that local director exchanges would only need four or fewer groups of directors instead of eight. But if, for example, A-digit levels 7 and 8 were combined, it would not be possible to have exchanges named PERivale and TERminus in the same network.

The other main UK conurbations followed suit, namely Manchester in 1930 (e.g., DEAnsgate 3414, the number for Kendals department store), Birmingham (in 1931), Glasgow (in 1937), and later Liverpool and Edinburgh (c. 1950).

The standards for assigning exchange name letters to digits varied in Europe, notably in the placement of the letters O, Q, and Z.

When national automatic Subscriber Trunk Dialling (STD) was introduced in the United Kingdom in 1958, the first two letters of main exchange names were often incorporated in the STD codes, e.g. Aylesbury was allocated STD code 0AY6. Where this was not possible, rivers or county names were often used, e.g. Brecon 0US4 (Usk Valley) and Braintree 0ES6 (Essex).

A switchover to all figure dialling began in 1966, although it was not until the early 1970s that all alphanumeric exchange names were converted. Despite the move to all-figure STD codes, and although the former Director areas were merged into single dialling codes and stated as all-figure numbers, until the 1990s it remained standard practice in the rest of the United Kingdom to state telephone numbers as exchange name + number, or include the exchange name before the national STD code. This was to enable callers to look up the correct dialling code, because calls to nearby exchanges often required a local dialling code rather than the STD code. Also, apart from All Figure Numbers and the largest conurbations, most automatic exchanges beyond about 100 miles could not be dialled using their STD codes. For this reason, subscribers were not told their own STD codes; they were not printed on their bills, nor were they shown against their listings in the directory.

In Paris and its suburbs, the conversion from 3L-4N to all numbers occurred in October 1963. For example, ÉLYsées became 379, LOUvre became 508, PIGalle became 744, and POMpadour became 706. However, until an eighth digit was added to telephone numbers in October 1985, it remained possible to use almost all the previous combinations.

== In popular culture ==
Telephone exchange names often provide a historical, memorable, and even nostalgic context, personal connection, or identity to a community. They can therefore often be found in popular culture, such as music, art, and prose.

An old 2L-5N format appears in the song title "PEnnsylvania 6-5000" (phone number PE 6-5000), recorded by Glenn Miller. The inspiration for that song, the Hotel Pennsylvania in New York City, held that phone number as +1-212-736-5000 until its closure in April 2020. PEnnsylvania 6-5000 was later spoofed in the Bugs Bunny cartoon Transylvania 6-5000 and the horror/comedy film Transylvania 6-5000. Other popular songs have used 2L-5N telephone exchanges in their names including: "BEechwood 4-5789", by The Marvelettes; "LOnesome 7-7203 by Hawkshaw Hawkins; and "ECho Valley 2-6809" by The Partridge Family.

The title of BUtterfield 8, the 1935 John O'Hara novel whose film adaptation won Elizabeth Taylor an Academy Award for Best Actress, refers to the exchange of the characters' telephone numbers (on the Upper East Side of Manhattan). Radio show Candy Matson, YUkon 2-8209 first aired on NBC West Coast radio in March 1949. Another movie title based on these types of phone exchanges is director Henry Hathaway's "Call Northside 777" (1948), starring Jimmy Stewart.

Artie Shaw and His Gramercy 5—Artie Shaw named his band the Gramercy Five after his home telephone exchange in Greenwich Village. In 1940 the original Gramercy Five pressed eight records, then dissolved this band in early 1941.

The 1952 stage play and screenplay by Frederick Knott "Dial M for Murder" refers to the MAIda Vale number used to summon the intended victim to the telephone.

Stan Freberg, on his 1966 album, Freberg Underground, objected to all digit dialing in song, including the lyrics:

They took away our Murray Hills,
They took away our Sycamores,
They took away Tuxedo and State,
They took away our Plaza, our Yukon, our Michigan,
And left us with 47329768…

== See also ==
- Phonewords
- Telephone keypad
