= Call management =

Telecommunications

Call management is the process of designing and implementing parameters for inbound telephone calls, which govern the routing of these calls through a network. The process is primarily used by corporations and call centres and is often supported by call logging software tools. Calls are routed according to the configuration of system features such as call queues, IVR menus, hunt groups, and recorded announcements. These features can provide a customized experience for the caller and help organize the distribution of calls. Call management parameters can specify how calls are distributed based on an agent's skill level, the time or date of the call, the caller's location, or through automatic routing processes.

== Calling features ==
Call management features vary from system to system and are based on an organization's needs to enhance customer experience. The systems commonly retain information from received calls which is stored, and can be analysed and interpreted by a system administrator. A call detail record or call recording software is used to record all received calls, including time, date, duration, calling number and called number for future reference.

Interactive voice response is a sound recording device that allows a caller to give information to a system verbally about what services or support they require. It uses speech recognition to direct callers on how to proceed while on the line. Another sound-based application is call whispering, which is a message played to an agent after answering a call that can give them information about the call in advance based on the Caller ID, number dialed or route taken through the system.

Call management can also include directory programming for received calls. A hunt group is a directory containing one or many destination numbers. Upon receiving an incoming call, the directory is programmed to ring in a particular order, simultaneously or simply in the order in which they have most recently answered before being sent to a final destination if still unanswered. Alternatively, call queues can be used to keep a caller on hold until one of the destination numbers becomes available.

== Routing ==
Call routing is the process of selecting a path for inbound telephone calls to individual agents or queues, often using computer telephony integration (CTI). In marketing and lead management systems, calls may also be routed as part of a broader lead routing process, in which incoming leads are distributed according to predefined business rules rather than purely telecommunication criteria. Automated processes include translation, which automatically reroutes calls from one telephone number to another, auto attendants, which are directories of extension numbers providing caller access, and fax to email functionality, which forwards inbound fax transmissions to one or more email addresses as attachments.

Corporations and call centres have developed more specific routing criteria, which typically consider the knowledge or skill level of the agent handling the call, the caller's location, or the time and date of the call. Skills-based routing directs calls to the most qualified agent available to address the caller's needs and may work in conjunction with omnichannel routing, which also accounts for the call's priority, the context of the customer journey, and the agent's workload in real time. Older methods include location-based routing, which distributes calls according to the caller's location, and time-based routing (also known as date-based routing), which routes calls depending on the time or date of the call.

== See also ==
- Direct Inward Dialing
- DnD - Do Not Disturb (Telecommunication)
