= IBM 1750, 2750 and 3750 Switching Systems =

Series of telephone exchange systems released by IBM

The IBM 1750, 2750 and 3750 Switching Systems were telephone exchange systems produced by IBM from the 1960s to the 1990s.

IBM engineers in the IBM La Gaude Research Laboratory, north-west of Nice in France, developed an electronic Private Automatic Branch Exchange: the first stored-program-controlled PABX to be marketed and installed worldwide. The product family handled up to 2516 extensions and 356 trunk lines. It was among the few IBM products still in use in five European countries for some 40 years following the 1969 market introduction of the IBM 2750 Switching System.

Before 1969, only electromechanical Strowger and Crossbar PABXs were available.

The IBM 1750, 2750 and 3750 Switching Systems family was developed from the IBM 1800. Each system included twin stored-program controllers (each with 32K or 64K main storage); some 600,000 lines of code; emergency and every-night automatic switchover; twin disks (none for the 2750); and solid-state switching. Extension, trunk and tie lines were connected by discrete transistors on plug-in panels. All systems were assembled in IBM's French Montpellier factory for France, Germany, Italy, and the UK.

== Early development ==
In the late 1960s, the French engineers at IBM La Gaude developed a prototype system based on the IBM 1130 to handle 500 telephone extensions and some 20 trunk lines to the local telephone exchange.

They then developed the marketable IBM 2750 Switching System, code-named Carnation, with IBM 1800 computers – two 1800s for fail-safe redundancy – each with 32K or later 64K of magnetic-core memory, and IBM Solid Logic Technology (SLT), but no disks (disk storage was new and very expensive then). Each central processing unit had its own transistorised switching network with crosspoint switching to maximise reliability.

The 2750 was greatly influenced by the European national telephone authorities (PTTs), who insisted on isolating-line transformers to protect their engineers. The 2750 had large 40 cm-by-30 cm plug-in extension packs, each handling only four telephone extensions with standard PTT 50-volt telephones. The Assembler-language program was loaded using punched paper tape, needing some 90 minutes for each of the two CPUs. Smaller maintenance programs could be loaded into unprotected storage. Fault finding was limited to 4K programs and needed an oscilloscope — but the 2750 was reliable enough to run 24/7.

An attached IBM Selectric typewriter let customers change system facilities, such as the extension numbers of telephones of repositioned staff. The 2750 was quiet as it was transistorised with no moving parts other than the cooling fans in the cabinets, compared with the noisy, electromechanical Strowger PABX systems that were everywhere across Europe.

== Countries, costs, installations, 1968 to 2010 ==
The 1968-available 2750 was sold in France, Germany, Italy, and Belgium; 3750s (1970) and 1750s (1979) were sold in these countries and the United Kingdom. In the UK, a 2750 was installed in the IBM Wigmore Street, London office; another was in IBM's plant in Havant, Hampshire: this was used for demonstrations and by the employees at the plant. The Netherlands installed some in IBM sites. Costs ranged from $150,000 to $600,000, plus up to $60,000 for the 3750's large room, air conditioning, and false flooring because of the extensive cabling between the three 3750 cabinets. By the time the 1750 was withdrawn from sales in 1988, there were some 300 systems installed in Europe. The 1750s and 3750s were still in use in 2010—some of the longest-life IBM products.

== Functions new to markets ==
In the 1970s, a 3750 toured Europe in three French lorries: a demonstration-suite lorry, a system lorry, and a generator lorry. Here, potential customers flocked to St Katherine's Pier near the Tower Bridge in London over several days. The people shown were the three French lorry drivers and five IBM UK staff.

Interior of the 1970s lorry-based 3750 demonstration suite driven throughout France, Germany, Italy and the UK. Note the use of a slide projector and the novelty of push-button telephones.

Long-distance and particularly international telephone calls were still very expensive in the 1970s. Although the 3750, when first marketed in 1970, cost almost double the equivalent-sized non-stored-program machines, the business case was compelling because the number of telephone operators could be halved. For the first time, organisations could determine what calls were made, where they were made to, and who made them. Suddenly, the phone bill could be allocated to departments and individuals instead of being a single item, with details of called numbers and duration. However, systems were mostly ordered because of the first-time use of touch-tone telephones, call re-routing, short-code dialling, etc (see below) — all functions taken for granted today.

== UK sales ==
The first 3750 customers in the UK were British Caledonian Airways at Gatwick, quickly followed by Insurance Brokers Bland Payne and Willis Faber & Dumas, in the City of London. Then Derbyshire County Council and Geest Bananas. Later, many household names installed 3750, such as Commercial Union, Great Universal Stores, Grosvenor House Hotel, Rowntree Mackintosh, Selfridges, Kwik Save, American Express, Mobil (a network including 1750s on North Sea oil and gas platforms), Unigate (dairies), Royal Bank of Scotland, Reckitt & Colman, Tesco, CWS (Co-operative Wholesale Society), and Greater Manchester Police (GMP) — GMP installed a 3750 at their headquarters Chester House, and later a network of 1750s around the Greater Manchester area.

== Systems ==
System	Years marketed	Years installed	Extensions	Trunks + tie lines	Operator desks	Main storage in each of the two controllers
IBM 2750 Switching System	1968 to 1970	1968 to late 1970s?	100-500?	up to 20?	up to 4?	32K and later 64K
IBM 3750 Switching System	1970 to 1990s	1970 to about 2010?	248 - 2516	32 - 356	2 - 18	64K
IBM 1750 Switching System	1979 to 1990s	1979 to about 2010	100 - 760	0 - 96	1 - 5	64K

The systems all had both voice and data functions. Early 1970s computers had hardly any typewriter-like terminals and certainly no screens – the IBM Switching Systems introduced the novelty of simple digital-data capture from every touch-tone telephone extension. But customers largely bought the systems for their then-new voice and management facilities.

The systems needed secure electricity night and day (2 to 15 kilowatts).

== Extension facilities ==
Facilities for the extensions were revolutionary at the time and particularly valued by organisations in financial and other industries with relatively highly-paid office-based employees:

- Touch-tone telephones (then practically new to Europe) for both voice and data entry
- Call rerouting from multiple extensions to answer points
- Camp on to a busy extension or external circuit with automatic callback
- Short-code dialling to national and international numbers
- Temporary call barring
- Distinctive ring cadences (different cadences for internal and incoming external calls)
- Dialled paging
- Group answering
- Authorised user intrusion
- Add-on third party
- Call pick-up
- Non-dialled connection (an off-hook extension automatically dials an extension).

== Management facilities ==
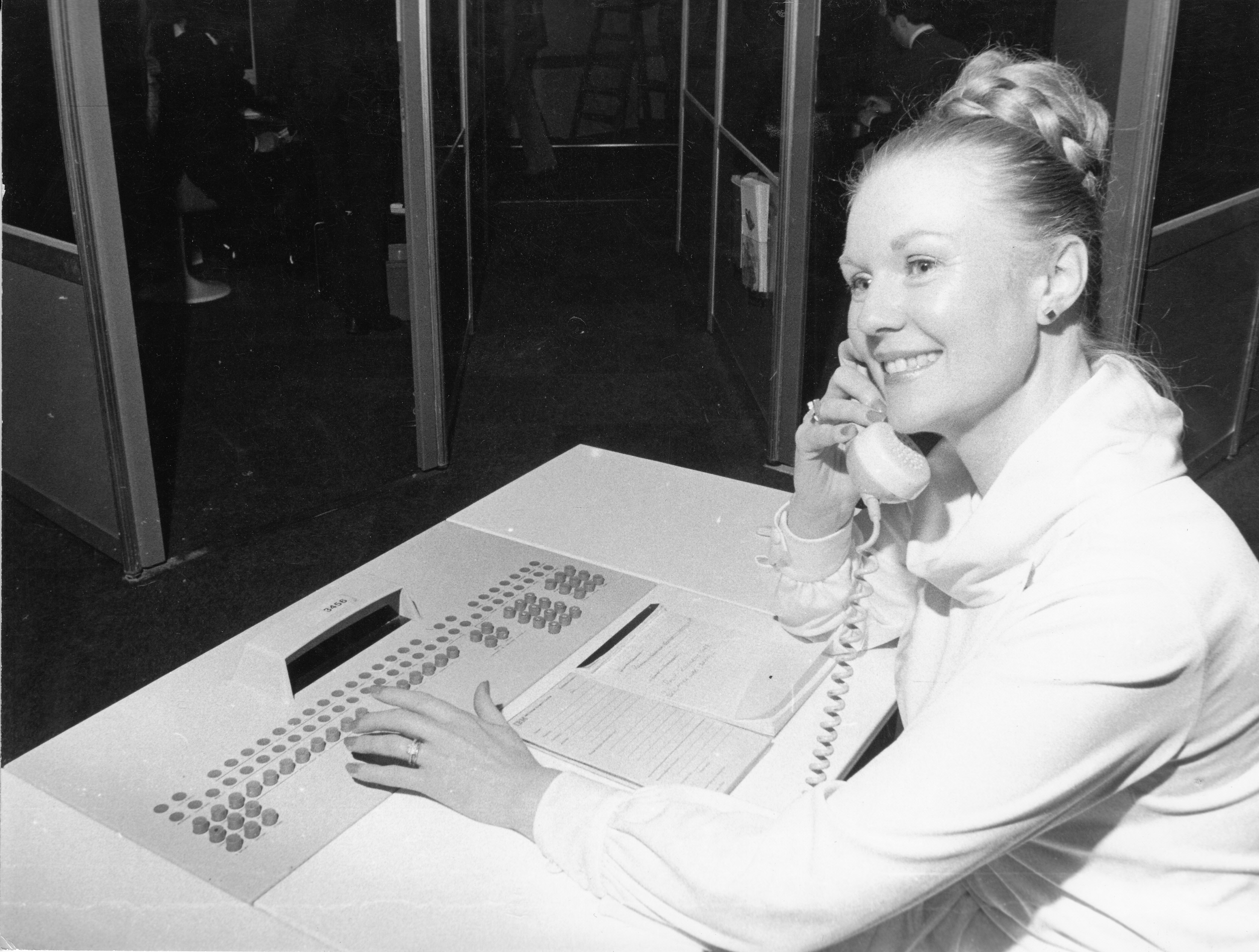
Centralised IBM 3755 Operator Desks could handle calls for multiple 3750s and 1750s dispersed across a country. They were initially developed at IBM La Gaude.

Most management facilities were new to the PABX market:

- IBM 3755 Operator Desk: optionally with braille-coded keys and audible alarms
- Extension number and facility changes made from a central keyboard
- Call cost recording
- Classes of service for extensions
- Traffic analysis
- Night service: pre-night, standard, special-type-1, and special-type-2 night services.

== Data facilities ==
The then-novel data facilities included:

- Data collection available from every touch-tone extension to the switching system or through it to an IBM computer
- IBM 3221 Numeric Multi-function Device: an extension-connected desktop terminal with a numeric keyboard and badge/card reader
- IBM 3223 Entry/Exit Reporter: an extension-connected wall-mounted magnetic-card-reader terminal for attendance recording and controlled access to secure areas
- Contact monitoring and operation.

IBM’s customers for instance used the data functions for staff to report chargeable activity from their telephones.

== Later additional facilities ==
Over time IBM introduced further functions:

- Satellite operation (remote operator call handling)
- The IBM Audio Distribution System (IBM 7770, based on an IBM Series/1 computer) – then-novel centralised voice-message recording for up to three thousand 1750, 3750 and worldwide users; 100 hours of recorded messages; and optional connection to an IBM computer for notification on recipients' screens
- Hotel functions such as automatic wake-up calls
- Partitioning: multiple organisations using one system.

== Networking ==
Widespread networks of systems became an important market for IBM. These multiple interconnected systems had central operating and control functions, tie-line busy back-up or rerouting via the public network, traffic saturation control, tie-line access restriction, network numbering up to 7 digits, remote paging, camping on a remote extension, and adding a third party remotely.

== Follow-on products ==
By 1984, IBM could see that there would be few sales by 1986 of the dated-technology 1750 and 3750 and that IBM's French development centre in La Gaude was not successfully developing a replacement product. So, in 1984, IBM bought the American company ROLM, that had more than 20,000 PABXs installed in the USA. IBM planned the ROLM system to be marketed in Europe as the IBM 8750, to replace the 1750 and 3750. Despite much IBM expenditure, this did not happen, largely because of the difficulty of modifying the ROLM product for European conditions. IBM then unsuccessfully negotiated to sell Siemens PABXs, before stopping marketing all PABXs. IBM continued to maintain the 1750s and 3750s before contracting others to maintain them in the 2000s. These were among the few IBM products still in use for nearly 40 years after their market introduction.

== IBM 8750 ==
IBM bought land in Wootton Bassett, just west of Swindon in England, to build a ROLM factory for Europe — the land was not used. In 1987, IBM started to market the ROLM-derived IBM 8750 Business Communications System in Austria, Belgium, France, Germany, Italy, Luxemburg, and the UK. Principally for homologation, a few had been installed in IBM locations, such as IBM Havant and IBM Portsmouth in England; however, none were installed in customer locations.

The 8750 had from 91 to 3000 telephone extensions; up to 1000 simultaneous conversations; a computer based on a Motorola 68020; up to 16 IBM 8755 Operator Consoles; a 30MB fixed disk; main/satellite working with 3750s and 1750s; digital trunks in Belgium, Italy and the UK; and used ISDN and Systems Network Architecture (SNA) networks.
