= Dial-Office IP-PBX =

- Developer(s): Dialexia
- Initial release: 2003
- Stable release: 4.1
- Operating system: Microsoft Windows, Linux
- Available in: English/French/Spanish
- Type: VoIP
- License: Proprietary
- Website: Dial-Office IP-PBX by Dialexia Communications, Inc.

Dial-Office IP-PBX is a SIP-based IP-PBX business phone system, first released in 2003 by Canadian telecommunications software provider Dialexia. The software allows users to connect multiple phones (e.g., extensions, ring groups, etc.), share lines among several phones and implement business PBX telephone phone features such as voicemail, caller ID, call forwarding & call recording into their system. Dial-Office is also suitable for multi-office connections, connecting branches which are geographically distant from each other. Dialexia Communications, Inc. released the latest version of Dial-Office IP-PBX (4.1) in 2013. On June 3, 2014, the company's development team announced in a client newsletter that support for Dial-Office versions 3.9 and earlier would cease effective September 1, 2014.

== SIP Compliance ==
Dial-Office IP-PBX includes a built-in SIP server and is fully SIP-compliant), ensuring that it has the highest level of interoperability with other SIP devices and services.

== Critical reception ==
In 2009, Billerica Public Schools manager Mark Bishop explained that the Dial-Office solution was the most comprehensive among the IP-PBX options they evaluated. "In less than a few weeks, and at one of the lowest cost per extension in the district school, we were able to get a complete infrastructure setup. From DID management, CPE Auto-provisioning, customer Web interface we were able to focus on adding new extensions and relying on Dial-Office to deliver the rest," said Bishop.

On May 21, 2014, Dial-Office was named runner-up in the IP-PBX Servers category of WindowsNetworking.com 2013-14 Readers' Choice Awards.
