= Call parking =

Call park is a feature of some telephone systems that allows a person to put a call on hold at one telephone set and continue the conversation from any other telephone set.

The “call park” feature is activated by pressing a preprogrammed button (usually labelled “Call Park”) or a special sequence of buttons. This transfers the current telephone conversation to an unused extension number and immediately puts the conversation on hold. (This is called parking the call; and the call is said to have parked onto a certain extension. Essentially, call parking temporarily assigns an extension number to an incoming call.) The telephone system will then display the extension number of the parked call so that the call can later be retrieved.

At this point, the telephone system will often provide an option for the person to make an announcement through a public address system (often consisting of some or all of the telephone sets and or overhead paging speakers controlled by the telephone system). Making such announcements in such a way is referred to as paging. To access the paging system, the user must enter the paging access code or press the "page" button on the telephone, and announce the call parked extension. An example would be at a grocery store where the bakery has a call parked. The user would say "Bakery you have a call parked on 627" and the bakery department would then dial 627 to access the call on hold.

A set time is then provided for any person to retrieve the call by dialing the extension number of the parked call on any telephone set.

If no one picks up the parked call within the set time, the telephone system may ring back the parked call. This transfers the parked call back to the person who originally parked the call.

== Uses of call parking ==
Call parking is often useful in buildings with many offices or with more than one floor, and with most of the areas having access to one or more telephone sets.

- If the desired called party is not the person who picked up the call, and the desired called party is at an unknown location, the person who picked up the call may park the call and then use the public address system to page the desired called party to pick up the call.
- During a conversation, a person may need to go to another office for some reason (for example, to retrieve an important file); parking the call allows this person to continue the conversation after arriving at the other office.

== See also ==
- Call pick-up
- Private branch exchange
- Telephone
