= HERO Hosted PBX =

- Developer(s): Dialexia
- Initial release: 2008
- Stable release: 4.3
- Operating system: Microsoft Windows, Linux
- Available in: English/French/Spanish
- Type: VoIP
- License: Proprietary
- Website: HERO Hosted PBX by Dialexia Communications, Inc.

HERO Hosted PBX is a SIP-based hosted IP-PBX business phone system, first released in 2008 by Canadian telecommunications software provider Dialexia. The HERO (Hosted Enterprise Remote Office) software allows users to connect multiple phones (e.g., extensions, ring groups, etc.), share lines among several phones and implement business PBX telephone phone features such as voicemail, caller ID, call forwarding & call recording into their virtual PBX. The software is also suitable for multi-office connections, connecting branches which are geographically distant from each other. Dialexia Communications, Inc. released the latest version of HERO Hosted PBX (4.3) in 2013.

On June 3, 2014, the Dialexia development team announced in a client newsletter that support for HERO versions 3.9 and earlier would cease effective September 1, 2014. The company advised customers to migrate to a currently-supported operating system in order to receive future security updates & technical support.

== Software overview ==
HERO Hosted PBX is composed of SIP Proxy, Registrar, and Presence server components that work together to allow real-time communication over IP networks. The software can be administered via web interface and is SIP-compliant), hence interoperable with other SIP devices and services. Other features include: Auto-Attendant IVR, emergency 911 support, integrated billing, cost & statistics reporting, device provisioning and failover and high availability support.

In 2009, HERO Hosted PBX was named 'Best Service Provider Solution' by the Technology Marketing Corporation (TMC) at the annual ITEXPO West conference held in Los Angeles.
