= KSU-less system =

Key telephone system

A KSU-less telephone system is a type of electronic key telephone system that puts the switching circuitry inside of each individual phone. This eliminates the need for a key service unit (KSU), which in traditional key systems is a centralized cabinet that contains the switching circuitry, and allows phones to be wired together in series while retaining certain advanced key system features such as intercom, paging, and hold. Unlike traditional key systems, however, KSU-less systems support a limited number of extensions and trunk lines and are typically not very scalable. The first KSU-less systems were introduced in the 1970s by the AT&T Corporation.

== History ==
In traditional key telephone systems, the key service unit (KSU) is a centralized cabinet containing the electronics that handle all of the switching of calls, with each phone connecting to the KSU with its own cable in a star topology. In KSU-less systems, the electronic circuitry is located inside each phone in the system, and the phones are wired in series, as is typical in standard in-wall installations. The advent of large-scale integrated circuits in the mid-1970s made the incorporation of such switching circuitry inside of the phone itself possible, and the first KSU-less system was introduced in 1975 with the Com Key 416 by the AT&T Corporation. The Com Key 416 differed from more modern KSU-less systems, in that the switching circuitry was located only within one phone, designated the master. One master phone supported two phone lines and eight extensions; two masters can be hooked together to support four phone lines and sixteen extensions. As with contemporaneous key system units, the switching circuitry inside the Com Key 416 still contained electromechanical components. With the progression of VLSI technology, newer KSU-less systems were designed with the ICs handling the switching located inside each phone in the system. This eliminated the need for a master phone and increased the reliability of the system.

== Wiring ==
Because of the in-series wiring scheme of most KSU-less systems, installation is typically easier than systems using a key service unit, and standard in-wall installations may be used. Unlike KSU systems or standard POTS lines, KSU-less systems typically require an external power supply unit for each extension. Some KSU-less units sacrifice a trunk to transmit power to each extension on the line, eliminating the need for external PSUs while reducing the number of connections to central offices. Other systems still have a recharable battery backup allowing phone service to continue in case mains power is lost.

Because of their limited amount of trunk connections and extensions, KSU-less systems are not as scalable and are mainly marketed at the small office/home office segment. A basic KSU-less system in the 1990s supported up to three lines and eight extensions, although some more advanced units supported up to four lines and sixteen extensions, and by the early 2000s units were available supporting up to 24 extensions. More advanced KSU-less units may also support a "non-square" topology, in which a private trunk line that cannot be accessed from all extensions can be wired up to only one phone.

== Features ==
The advanced features of KSU-less systems, such as intercom, paging, hold, and transfer, are able to function on the same wire as normal phone service because the switching circuitry moves the inter-office voice path, as well as the signaling necessary to establish such paths, to the high-frequency RF band. Concurrent intercoms are typically not possible on basic KSU-less systems; some advanced systems support up to two simultaneous intercoms. KSU-less systems before the late 1990s typically shared the voicemail between all phones, presenting a potential privacy issue. With the advent of affordable flash storage in the turn of the millennium, KSU-less systems began supporting per-extension voicemail, as well as auto attendants, which presents outside callers with a prerecorded voice menu to dial specific extensions. Due to incompatible signaling schemes, different vendor's KSU-less phones typically cannot be mixed together in the same system.
