= Dialexia =

Software company in Canada

Dialexia Communications, Inc.
- Type: Private
- Industry: Telecommunication
- Founded: Montreal, Quebec, Canada (2001)
- Founder: Ahmed Aina; Mohamed El-Mohri
- Headquarters: Montréal, Quebec, Canada
- Area served: Worldwide
- Products: IP PBX; Network Management; Interface and Module, Telepresence, VOIP
- Website: www.dialexia.com

Dialexia Communications, Inc. is a privately held Canadian corporation headquartered in Montréal, Quebec, that develops, manufactures, and sells VoIP-based Telecommunication products and services.

== Overview ==
The company specializes in the development of webRTC-enabled PBX software for organizations in specific sectors of activity, notably education & hospitality. Dialexia software enables users to connect multiple phones (e.g., extensions, ring groups, etc.), share lines among several phones and implement business PBX telephone phone features such as voicemail, caller ID, call forwarding & call recording into their virtual PBX.

In a November 2014 press release, Dialexia announced the addition of WebRTC capabilities to its line of PBX software products. Founded in Montreal in 2001, the company is a member of the Board of Trade of Metropolitan Montreal.

== History ==
Soon after its establishment, Dialexia released Dial-Office IP-PBX, an IP PBX platform designed as an alternative to the circuit-switched telephone network. PBX is a system that connects telephone extensions of a company to outside public telephone network as well as to mobile networks. On May 21, 2014, Dial-Office was named runner-up in the IP-PBX Servers category of WindowsNetworking.com 2013-14 Readers' Choice Awards.

In 2003, Dialexia released Dial-Gate Softswitch PBX, a web-based softswitch and billing server based on the Session Initiation Protocol. A softswitch, short for software switch, is a central device in a telecommunications network which connects telephone calls from one phone line to another, across a telecommunication network or the public Internet, entirely by means of software running on a general-purpose computer system.

In 2008, the company released HERO Hosted PBX, a hosted PBX platform made for operators and large corporations wanting to host IP PBX services on office grounds.

== See also ==
- Softswitch
- IP PBX
- List of SIP software
