= Location-based routing =

Method of telecommunication switching

Location-based routing is a system of rules to varying degrees of complexity dictating where inbound telephone calls from various locations are routed to. The location of call origin is normally determined by the outgoing caller ID of the caller but can also be determined by GPS position or signal triangulation, the latter being particularly useful for calls coming from mobile phones.

== Uses ==
Having a call management system that knows the location of an incoming call allows for a wide range of applications –

- Retail chain-outlets can have a single telephone number nationwide and use location-based routing to route callers automatically to their local store.
- Franchises can be set up under a single brand with each franchisee servicing a particular locale and fielding its calls.
- Inbound sales enquiries can be relayed automatically to the regional sales manager appropriate for the caller's location.

== Granularity ==
Routing rules can be specified to different sizes of catchment area. For instance, a different caller route can be defined for each country that a call could originate from. This would be done using the international dialling codes of the incoming caller ID.

On the other hand, specific landline area codes can be programmed in to have their own specific destination.

The furthest that can be gone is to program in separate destinations for individual telephone numbers that call in. Systems can also be programmed to send callers that withhold their caller ID down a specific route, thereby acting as an anonymous call rejection device.

== See also ==
- Caller ID
- Call Whisper
