= Remote call =

Remote call can refer to:

- Remote procedure call
  - Open Network Computing Remote Procedure Call
- Remote call forwarding
- Remote Function Call
