= IBM 8750 Business Communication System =

Business communication system

The IBM 8750 Business Communications System was a voice and data switching system PABX, suitable for medium to large numbers of extensions, used on customer premises." The 8750 was the European version of the IBM 9751, also a ROLM design.

In 1984, IBM bought the American company ROLM. In 1987 IBM started to market the ROLM-derived IBM 8750 in Austria, Belgium, France, Germany, Italy, Luxemburg, and the UK. Principally for homologation, a few had been installed in IBM locations, such as IBM Havant in England – however none were installed in customer locations.

The 8750 had from 91 to 3000 telephone extensions; up to 1000 simultaneous conversations; a computer based on a Motorola 68020; up to 16 IBM 8755 Operator Consoles; a 30MB fixed disk; main/satellite working with IBM 3750 and 1750 Switching Systems; digital trunks in Belgium, Italy and the UK; and ISDN and Systems Network Architecture (SNA) networks.

IBM later sold ROLM to Siemens who then continued to market the 8750.

== See also ==
- IBM 1750, 2750 and 3750 Switching Systems
