= Dial Gate VoIP Softswitch =

Dial-Gate VoIP Softswitch
- Developer(s): Dialexia
- Initial release: 2006
- Stable release: 4.3
- Operating system: Windows, Linux
- Available in: English/French/Spanish
- Type: VoIP
- License: Proprietary
- Website: dialexia.com/voip-softswitch

Dial-Gate VoIP Softswitch is a SIP-based IP-PBX software for businesses, first released in 2006 by Canadian VoIP PBX solution provider Dialexia. The software serves as a web-based softswitch and billing server for VoIP and PSTN networks. On June 3, 2014, the Dialexia development team announced in a client newsletter that support for Dial-Gate Softswitch versions 3.9 and earlier would cease effective September 1, 2014. The company advised customers to migrate to a currently-supported operating system in order to receive future security updates & technical support.

== Software overview ==
The Dial-Gate billing platform provides users with advanced real-time monitoring, pre-/post-paid billing, rate/route table management, and CDR report generation. It is integrated with Microsoft Exchange Server to provide voicemail unification, instant messaging and VideoOverIP. On November 19, 2014, Dialexia issued a press release announcing the integration of WebRTC capabilities to Dial Gate Softswitch PBX.
