= OPX =

OPX may refer to:

== Science ==
- OPX, a class of Martian meteorites
- Orthopyroxene, a type of rock-forming mineral

== Technology ==
- Off-premises extension, an extension telephone
- Open Programming Extension, a DLL mechanism of the Open programming language
- Silver Xpress, a mail format used on FidoNet
