= IPKall =

- Company type: Private
- Headquarters: United States
- Website: www.ipkall.com

IPKall was a public switched telephone network to voice over IP call forwarding service. Users were able to register with the service to obtain a phone number chosen from several Washington State area codes and have all calls to that number forwarded to their Session Initiation Protocol or Inter-Asterisk eXchange uniform resource identifier, including an Asterisk server.

The telephone company that provided IPKall numbers is International Telcom; they also provide a flat-rate $1/month area code 206 inbound fax service as Faxaway, a non-free voice and fax service as Kall8 (with toll-free or US local numbers) and the Kallback and KallCents discount outbound long-distance services.

IPKall's popularity stemmed from the fact that it was probably the last remaining, widely accessible US-based VoIP service offering free-of-charge PSTN numbers.

== Business model ==
The IPKall business model appears to be based on its ability to charge termination rates for calls reaching its subscribers, estimated at about $.01/min, as the service is free for end users. The wholesale price for major interexchange carriers to terminate calls to independent telcos in rural Washington (state) and similar locations (such as northern Minnesota and Iowa) is often several cents a minute higher than typical US48 rates; this money is effectively a subsidy to the destination local rural exchange.

New registered numbers should receive a call within 72 hours of creation. And also, numbers which don't receive calls within 30 days are taken to be inactive and removed from the service.

Direct customer support is not provided. The free plan does not support outgoing calls, except to toll-free telephone numbers.

== Discontinuation of service ==
On February 16, 2016, IPKall announced the discontinuation all existing services as of May 1, 2016 without explanation.

== See also ==
- Voice over IP
- Direct inward dial
- Traffic pumping
