= Ringback =

Ringback may refer to:

- Ring back, a ringing signal sent back to the calling party on an established connection.
- Ringback tone, the tone heard by a calling party to indicate that the called phone is ringing.
- Ringback number, a number used by phone companies to test whether a telephone line and phone number is working
- Automatic ring back, a telephone feature to notify the caller when the called party ceases to be engaged
