= Night service =

Any service that operates or is provided at night is a night service. It may also refer to:

- Night service (public transport), a public transport service that runs at night
- Night service (telephony), a feature of a telephone system for business
- Isha prayer, the night-time daily prayer recited by practising Muslims
- Vigil, a period of purposeful sleeplessness, an occasion for devotional watching, or an observance
