= *82 =

Vertical service code

This Vertical Service Code, *82, enables calling line identification regardless of subscriber preference, dialed to unblock withheld numbers (private callers) in the U.S. on a per-call basis. If Caller ID is subscribed to or enabled on the line receiving the call, the unblocked phone number and registered name is displayed – unable to determine that the caller subscribes to outgoing callerID blocking or that *82 has been dialed to temporarily override that subscription. *82 can be dialed from U.S. land-line house phones and business lines, as well as most cell phones and mobile devices. Some mobile devices may alternatively offer or require a menu selection to override Caller ID blocking per call.

To correctly unblock a number, listen for a dial tone, dial *82, and listen for the momentary flashing dial tone which confirms the override. Then establish the connection as usual by dialing 1, the area code, and the phone number to complete the call.

Anonymous Call Rejection (*77) is offered to subscribers, so in some situations it is necessary to dial *82 in order to ring through and complete the call to those lines that subscribe to and enable anonymous call rejection. Notice is given to anonymous callers with an intervening recorded message from the phone company that rejected anonymous call may be completed when Caller ID is enabled and valid.

== In popular culture ==
Star 82 Review is a literary journal published since 2012 which is named after the *82 function: "Star 82 is the code needed to unblock one's phone number. Tell us who you are. Someone will answer."
