= Do Not Disturb (telecommunications) =

Function on most PBX or PABX systems

The Do Not Disturb or (DND) function on most PBX or PABX systems prevents calls from ringing on an extension for which DND is activated. Some Do Not Disturb (DND) attributes include directing the call to a preassigned extension (like a secretary or assistant), busy signal, DND signal, or recorded message generated by the telephone switch. Some switches allow the call to go through to the extension but restrict the response to a visual indication. Some PBX systems allow the assignment of DND circumvention codes to supervisors. The implementation of this feature is vendor-specific. In some cases, the ringer just does not ring and the called party is thus not alerted. Usually, though, the phone just acts as being busy. Depending on the infrastructure, the caller may end up on the called party's voice mailbox, sometimes after a certain delay. Some special configurations combine DND with other features like call forwarding, where calls to a party with DND on are forwarded to another phone.

== Private Branch Exchange ==
A do-not-disturb (DND) signal on private branch exchange (PBX) or private automatic branch exchange (PABX) phone systems silences calls to a telephone when the feature is activated. If the system is set up that way, calls can be redirected to another extension or voicemail—or a busy signal or recorded message may be heard by the caller. The exact action will vary according to the telephone system and how it's set up.

== Mobile devices ==
To prevent users receiving notifications, alerts and incoming calls, Apple launched a Do Not Disturb feature in iOS. Do Not Disturb became part of Apple's new Focus system in iOS 15, released in 2021, so you can use it from Control Center or setup it in Settings, and can select which people and apps can send notifications, and set times when interruptions can be limited. It can also be set to turn on automatically.
