= Direct dialing =

Direct dialing may refer to:

- Direct distance dialing, where a caller may call any other user outside the local calling area without operator assistance
- Direct inward dialing, where an outside call may be automatically routed to an extension through a private branch exchange
- International direct dialing, where a caller may place an international call without operator assistance
