= IBM La Gaude =

Former computer research lab in France

IBM Forum La Gaude

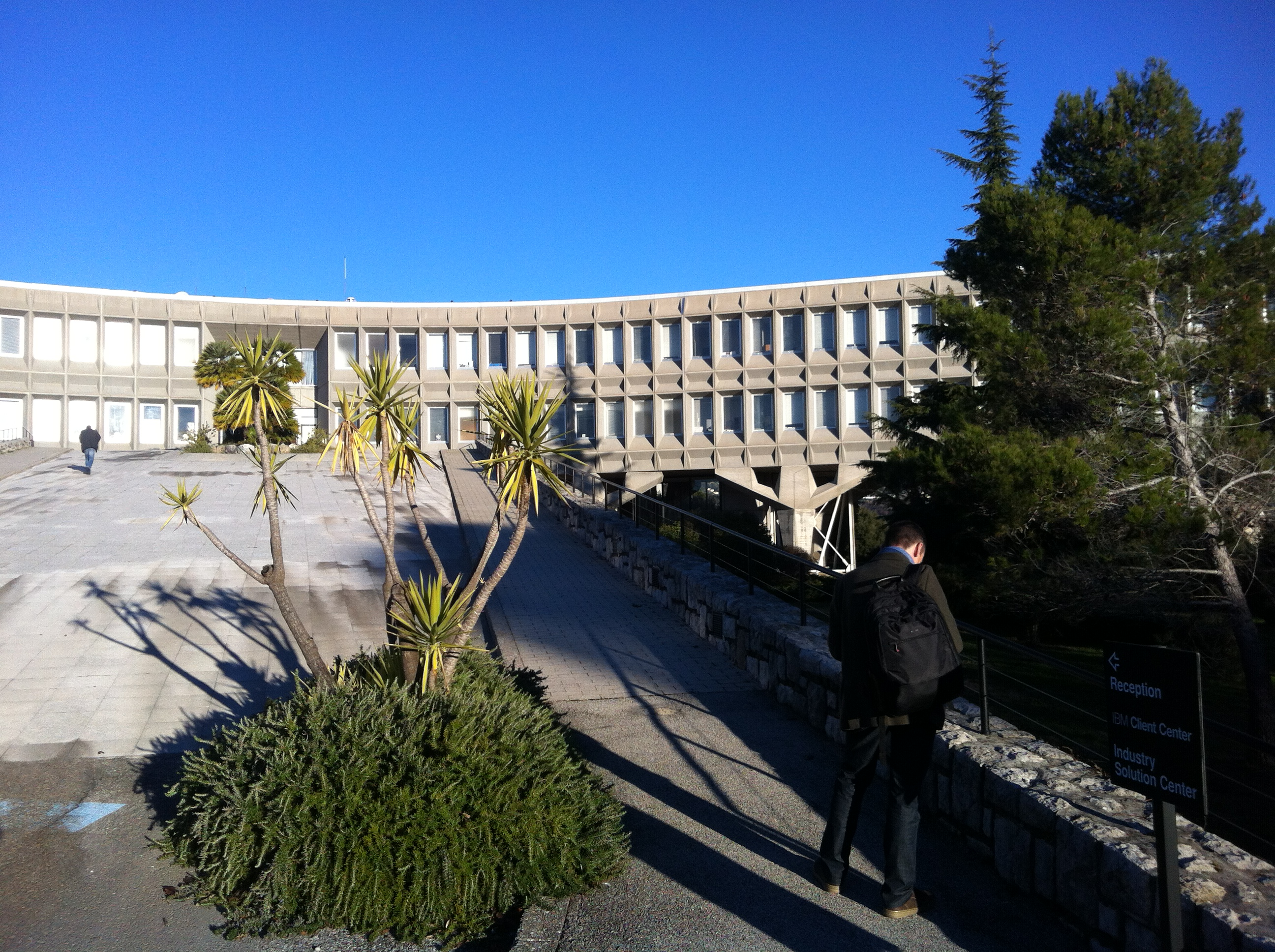
- IBM La Gaude in 2014

General information
- Architectural style: Brutalism
- Coordinates: 43.732177°N 7.167064°E
- Completed: 1962
- Owner: IBM

Design and construction
- Architect: Marcel Breuer

Website
- IBM Forum La Gaude at the Wayback Machine (archived 2010-08-03)

The IBM La Gaude Study and Research Centre (Centre d'études et recherches IBM La Gaude) was a computer research laboratory for IBM in La Gaude, just west of Nice on the Côte d'Azur (French Riviera) on France's southeastern coast. In the 1990s, it became a presentation centre for IBM Business Solutions. IBM left the site in 2015.

== World's first computer-controlled business telephone systems ==
French IBM engineers developed the world's first computer-controlled business telephone systems at IBM La Gaude.

== 1962 laboratory relocation from Paris to La Gaude ==
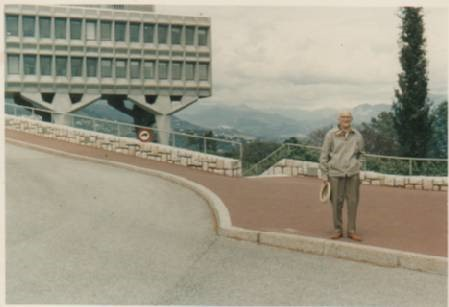
IBM La Gaude in the early 1970s, with the Alps in the distance.

IBM moved its French research and product-development laboratory from Paris to a purpose-built, 35,000-square-metre (380,000 sq ft) building, designed by the architect Marcel Breuer, in 23 hectares (57 acres) of rough countryside near the village of La Gaude overlooking Nice and Nice airport. IBM chose the location because it could attract the cream of French engineers to work on the French Riviera, it was close to France's second-largest airport, and because it complied with the French government's policy to decentralise from Paris and build away from urban centres.

Initially 700 people, mostly engineers, worked there. By 1987 there were 1,500 engineers in the original B1 building. The B2 building was built in 1969 and B3 (with a patio) in 1978. From 1984 to 1986 reinforcements were made to reduce the risk of earthquake damage. Staff included IBM employees from other European countries and the US. In 2015 most staff were displaced to a new centre nearer Nice.

== Products ==
IBM La Gaude developed telecommunication products for IBM's worldwide markets. For European markets there were the IBM 1750, 2750 and 3750 Switching Systems (world-wide the first electronic computer-controlled business telephone systems widely called PABXs — Private Automatic Branch Exchanges). For world markets La Gaude engineers developed the IBM 270x series of communication controllers, modems, and other IBM products.

In 1963, IBM La Gaude established a satellite link to IBM Endicott in the US at 3,300 words per minute.

== Relocation from La Gaude ==
On 25 October 2007, more than 200 employees demonstrated against the transfer of personnel to AT&T.

In August 2015, some 530 IBM staff moved from La Gaude to the new IBM Innovation Center Nice in the Méridia high-tech district by the River Var close to Nice. Some IBM staff continued to work at IBM La Gaude; the buildings are also used by other organisations.
