= Murder of Dorothy Jane Scott =

Unsolved murder in the United States

Murder of Dorothy Scott
- Location: Anaheim, California, U.S.
- Date: May 28, 1980 (abduction); August 6, 1984 (discovery of remains)
- Attack type: Murder, kidnapping, stalker killing, arson
- Perpetrator: Unknown
- Motive: Undetermined

Dorothy Jane Scott (April 23, 1948 — May 28, 1980) was an American woman who disappeared on May 28, 1980, in Anaheim, California. After driving two co-workers to the hospital, Scott went to fetch her car to take them back to their workplace. However, as her car approached them, it sped away; neither could see who was driving as its headlights had blinded them. The co-workers reported Scott missing a couple of hours later, after not hearing from her. In the preceding months, Scott had been receiving anonymous phone calls from a man who had reportedly been stalking her and had left threatening messages.

In June 1980, a man called The Orange County Register, a local newspaper that had reported Scott's disappearance, and claimed that he had killed Scott. Police believe the caller was Scott's killer. From 1980 to 1984, Scott's mother also received phone calls from a man who claimed to have Scott or to have killed her. None of the calls could be traced, however, because the caller would not stay on the line long enough. In August 1984, partial human remains were found and later identified as Scott's. No arrests have been made in Scott's case.

== Background ==
Dorothy Scott was a single mother living in Stanton, California, twenty-four miles southeast of Los Angeles, with her aunt and four-year-old son. She was a secretary for two jointly-owned Anaheim stores. Co-workers and friends recall that Scott preferred staying at home, was a devout Christian and did not engage in substance abuse. Her parents, who lived in Anaheim, babysat their grandson while she worked. Scott's father, Jacob, said his daughter may have dated on occasion but, as far as the family knew, had no steady boyfriend.

Months before her abduction, Scott had received strange phone calls at work from an unidentified male. The caller alternately professed his love for Scott and his intent to kill her. Scott's mother recounted, "One day he called and said to go outside because he had something for her. She went out and there was a single dead red rose on the windshield of her car." Scott's mother said one call especially horrified her daughter, in which the man reportedly stated he would get her alone and "cut [her] up into bits so no one will ever find [her]". Because of the calls, Scott began considering the purchase of a handgun; about a week before her disappearance, she started taking karate lessons.

== Events ==
At 9 p.m. on May 28, 1980, Scott attended an employee meeting at work. She noted co-worker Conrad Bostron did not look well and had a red mark on his arm. Scott and another co-worker, Pam Head, left the meeting to take Bostron to the emergency room at UC Irvine Medical Center. On the way to the hospital, they stopped by Scott's parents' house to check on her son; Scott took this occasion to change from her black scarf to a red one. At the hospital, medical personnel determined Bostron had suffered a bite from a black widow spider and treated him; Head said she and Scott remained in the waiting room. At no time, Head said, did Scott leave her side.

Bostron was discharged around 11 p.m. and given a prescription. Scott offered to bring her car to the exit; she did not want Bostron to walk too far in his condition, as he was still not feeling well. Head said Scott used the restroom briefly before heading out to the parking lot. Head and Bostron filled his prescription and waited at the exit for Scott; when they did not see her after a few minutes they went out to the hospital's parking lot. Suddenly, they saw Scott's car speeding toward them; its headlights blinded them so they could not see who was behind the wheel. They waved their arms to try to get Scott's attention, but the car sped past them and took a sharp right turn out of the parking lot. Initially, both thought Scott had been summoned to an emergency involving her son. A few hours later, after not hearing from her, Head and Bostron reported Scott missing. At about 4:30 a.m. on May 29, Scott's car, a white 1973 Toyota station wagon, was found burning in an alley about 10 miles (16 km) from the hospital. Neither she nor her supposed kidnapper were anywhere nearby.

=== Mysterious phone calls ===
About a week after Scott's disappearance, her parents, Jacob and Vera, received a phone call from an unidentified man who said, "I've got her" and hung up. The same man called "almost every Wednesday afternoon" and said either that he had Scott or had killed her. The calls were usually brief, and usually occurred when Vera was home alone. In April 1984, the man called during the evening; Jacob answered and the calls stopped. After Scott's remains were found in August 1984, the family started receiving calls again. Police installed a voice recorder at the Scott residence. They were not able to trace the calls, however, because the man never stayed on the line long enough.

A possible motivation in Scott's murder surfaced June 12, 1980, when an unidentified man called the front desk at the Orange County Register, which had run a story that day about the case. A managing editor told police that the caller had said, "I killed her. I killed Dorothy Scott. She was my love. I caught her cheating with another man. She denied having someone else. I killed her." The editor also said the caller knew Bostron had suffered from a spider bite the night of May 28 and knew Scott had changed her black scarf to a red one prior to arriving at the hospital. Neither of these details had been published in the Register article. The caller also claimed Scott phoned him from the hospital that night. Head disputed that claim, saying she had been with Scott the entire time and she had not made a phone call. Investigators believe the anonymous caller is responsible for Scott's death.

== Discovery of remains ==
On August 6, 1984, a construction worker discovered dog and human bones side by side, about 30 feet (10 m) from Santa Ana Canyon Road. The bones were partly charred and authorities believed they had been there for two years, as a bushfire had "swept across the site" in 1982. A turquoise ring and watch were also found. Scott's mother said the watch had stopped at 12:30 a.m. on May 29, about an hour after Head and Bostron last saw Scott's vehicle. On August 14, the bones were identified as Scott's by dental records. An autopsy could not determine the cause of death. A memorial service was held on August 22.

== See also ==
- Lists of solved missing person cases
- List of unsolved murders (1980–1999)
