= Continuous redial =

Telephone services feature

Continuous redial, busy number redial, or repeat dial is a vertical service code (calling feature) that allows callers to automatically redial a busy telephone number until a connection is made. It was introduced in 1992 as Repeat Dialing, and is activated by dialing a combination of special characters and numbers after hanging up following a call to a busy line. It will run for a set period of time (such as 30 minutes) and can be deactivated by entering either the same set of numbers or a different set. The North American Numbering Plan assigned *66 to activate continuous redial and *86 to deactivate it.
