= Priority call =

A priority call is a telephone call that has been assigned some enhanced level of priority for processing by a telecommunications network such that it may be expected to achieve precedence over other traffic. In a given network, there may be several levels of priority.

Priority call, and priority ring also refer to calling features which give a distinctive ring to calls from telephone numbers chosen by the subscriber. The service may require a subscription from their telephone company. To set up priority call, the subscriber dials the vertical service code *61 and follows the instructions.

== See also ==
- Enhanced 911 – System that provides a caller's location to emergency dispatchers
- Message precedence – Indicator attached to telegraph message indicating its level of urgency
