= Speed calling =

Telephone service in some countries

Speed calling service allows telephone subscribers to assign one or two digit speed calling codes, by dialing a change speed calling list access code, a feature code, and a new telephone number. Thereafter, the subscribers need only use the assigned speed code to reach the desired party rather than dial the long phone number. This service became commonplace in the 1970s with the spread of Stored Program Control exchanges capable of implementing the required databases. It remains useful in installations of many extensions where programming each telephone set would be arduous. Speed calling subscriptions have largely been replaced by the introduction of telephone handsets which incorporate a local version of speed dial.

Speed Calling allows subscribers to program shortcuts for telephone numbers to dial them quickly with just one or two digits. Both Speed Calling 8 and Speed Calling 30 require a subscription from your local telephone company.

Speed Calling 8 allows subscribers to assign a telephone number to each of the digits 2 through 9, a total of eight numbers. To program the numbers, dial *74, followed by the digit 2 through 9 to assign the number to, followed by the full telephone number as you would normally dial it. Then, to dial the number in the future, dial the digit 2 through 9 followed by #.

Speed Calling 30 allows subscribers to assign a telephone number to each of the numbers 20 through 49, a total of 30 numbers. To program the numbers, dial *75, followed by the number 20 through 49 to assign the number to, followed by the full telephone number as you would normally dial it. Then, to dial the number in the future, dial the number 20 through 49 followed by #.

== See also ==
- Speed dial
