= Remote call forwarding =

In telecommunications, remote call forwarding is a service feature that allows incoming calls to be forwarded to a remote call forwarding number, such as a cell phone or another office location, and is designated by the call receiver.

Customers may have a remote-forwarding telephone number in a central switching office without having any other local telephone service in that office.

One common purpose for this service is to enable customers to retain their telephone number when they move to a location serviced by a different telephone exchange. The service is useful for business customers with widely advertised numbers which appear on headed paper, vehicles and various marketing literature. When customers ring, their calls are forwarded to the new location.

Remote call forwarding is also a means for a suburban business to obtain a city-centre local number (with its full large-city coverage area) for inbound calls; while cheaper than a foreign exchange line, this can reduce long-distance telephony costs in markets where local calls are flat-rated but trunk calls are expensive.

One alternative to RCF is Caller Redirect whereby callers simply hear an intercept message notifying them that the number has changed. Another alternative is to port the existing number to a voice over IP carrier, which is not tied to a single physical location as the subscriber may be anywhere on broadband Internet. However, not all phone numbers can be ported.

== Remote Access to Call Forwarding ==
Remote Call Forwarding (RCF) requires neither a physical telephone set nor physical input by customer to get calls forwarded.

In this respect, it differs from the (similarly named) Remote Access to Call Forwarding in that the number is attached to a physical line where it rings normally until a call is made to a remote number to enable redirection.

To activate Remote Access to Call Forwarding, a subscriber calls a provider-supplied Remote Access Directory Number, enters the telephone number of the line to be redirected along with a personal identification number (PIN), a vertical service code (such as 72# or *73) and the number to which the calls are to be forwarded.

Remote Access to Call Forwarding allows incoming calls to be diverted and answered elsewhere if a subscriber cannot use their telephone normally (for instance, the number is assigned to a lost or stolen wireless handset or to a landline in need of repair service). In some cases, a business which subscribes to standard call forwarding (*72) may be able to request temporary redirection of inbound calls when calling a telco repair service number (such as 6-1-1) to report a line outage.
