= Reference computer =

Aid for switchboard operators

Reference Computer is a computerized supplement to PBX (Private Branch Exchange or PBX) that supports the internal telephone directory, absence data and messages. Reference Computer is an effective aid for the switchboard operator as information on the lines are obtained directly from a display.

Reference computer is connected to the telephone exchange and a call comes in to an extension the computer shows all the data about that extension automatically. Reference computer enabled a sophisticated information management in large companies. People in the workplace could from their phones enter information about absences cause and time of return simply by entering certain digits on his telephone apparatus.

The first complete reference computer attached to PBX in the Swedish Telecom company's network had the name SESAM and came in operation in the early 1980s. It was associated initially with company's electromechanical telephone A344 (and thus gave it a host of new modern services).

The big break for reference computer, which is a Swedish invention, came when the telephone service's large "electronic PBX" A345 and A335 were provided with a reference computer (HVD). Several such existed in the Swedish market. SESAM system was first developed and marketed, then from the mid-1980s, known as PRESENT. These two systems were developed by four engineers from the telephone company who has obtained a Swedish patent for the invention. The patent was declared invalid in 1991 after the telephone company itself had sought annulment in the Stockholm District Court and the Svea Court of Appeal. State Board of Workers' inventions (SNAU) stated that it was a recommendation that the four engineers of the telephone company would hold SEK 3 million by the employer. Televerket and TeliaSonera AB has however refused to pay compensation. Subsequently, SNAU twice considered the question if the inventors are entitled to compensation. The issue is not yet finally settled by SNAU. The dispute has lasted for over 30 years. Reference computers and direct function in the newer PBX contributed to the rationalization of the telecom network. There is now a reference feature in the software in most modern PBX.
