= Application Session Controller =

In computer networking, the Application Session Controller (ASC) network element resides at the application layer and sits between the application layer and the core network to provide and manage connectivity to the evolving telecom network. The ASC incorporates a number of open standard APIs, plus the signaling, media between disparate networks that converged. It insulates the application server farm from the network below via a programmable network abstraction engine, thereby providing the application specific call-control functions independent of each network.

The ASC incorporates a number of open standard APIs, plus the signaling, media, and the feature inter-working between disparate networks that converged and consolidated applications require. It is scalable to support tens of millions of subscribers via a single system or via clustering and provides the necessary calls per second / transactions per second required for large-scale multi-network environments.

As Communications Service Providers continue to deploy new network assets and technology at an increasingly rapid pace, achieving feature transparency becomes very challenging. The benefit of creating a solution to ensure feature transparency will provide subscribers application feature parity across multiple networks, enable the service providers to consolidate their application platforms and fully enable them to leverage their network assets to offer converged applications across ever evolving networks.

== See also ==
- Session border controller
- Call control
