= Off-premises extension =

An off-premises extension (OPX), sometimes also known as off-premises station (OPS), is an extension telephone at a location distant from its servicing exchange or the primary service location.

One type of off-premises extension, connected to a private branch exchange (PBX), is generally used to provide employees with access to a company telephone system while they are out of the office. Off-premises extensions are used in distributed environments, serving locations that are too far from the PBX to be served by on-premises wiring.

Another type of off-premises extension, connected to a public telephone exchange, is generally used to allow a private phone line to ring at a second location. For example, the owner of a business may have an OPX for their home phone at the business location, allowing them to avoid missing calls to the home phone; conversely, the owner may choose to have an OPX for the business line at the home address. Telephone service providers charge a significant monthly rate for an OPX, partly calculated by the distance; in extreme cases, the distance may result in a rate higher than simply having an additional central office line with its own number.

Answering services were users of such technology, with an OPX of the business telephone of each client so that answering service employees could personally answer calls to the business outside regular hours.

Recent innovations such as call forwarding-no answer or simultaneous ringing of multiple lines can replace several of the conveniences of an OPX at much lower cost.

An OPX uses a conditioned wire pair that is usually used only for voice applications, while for data, a pair usually needs to be unconditioned. An alarm circuit is an unconditioned pair.

In Internet telephony, a VoIP VPN OPX may be implemented by connecting an extension over a virtual private networking connection, instead of connecting it directly to the local area network. As a host connected by a VPN appears as a part of the local area network, the off-premises extension appears to the IP-PBX as if it were on-site.

== See also ==
- Foreign exchange service (telecommunications)
- Hosted PBX
