= Call processing =

In telecommunications, the term call processing has the following meanings:

1. The sequence of operations performed by a switching system from the acceptance of an incoming call through the final disposition of the call. See call control for a more complete description.
2. The series of steps and processes by which an organization automates the handling of telephone calls (usually incoming calls). Call processing in this sense may include the initial greeting of the call (perhaps time-of-day or other factor dependent) to routing the call based on dialed digits or lack thereof. The automated treatment may include routing the call to an Interactive Voice Response System (IVR), sending the call to a voice mail system, queuing the call, etc. or a combination of steps and real-time decisions. See also Automated attendant.
3. The end-to-end sequence of operations performed by a network from the instant a call attempt is initiated until the instant the call release is completed.
4. In data transmission, the operations required to complete all three phases of an information transfer transaction.

"Volume Call Processing" is the handling of calls when there are far more incoming calls than can be answered by an individual or group of attendants.

== See also ==
- Call control
- Missed call
