= Night service (telephony) =

Night service in telephony is a feature of private branch exchanges and other business telephone systems, whereby for a set period during the day (usually those hours outside of normal office or work hours, when normal operator services are not provided), all incoming calls are automatically redirected by the switchboard to a specific extension or to equipment such as an answering machine or other voice mail system.

In systems without direct inward dial capability, all calls for a large organisation originally were placed to the facility's main number, where a switchboard operator or attendant would ask which extension or department the caller intended to reach. The call would then be transferred manually. As soon as the front office closed for the day, the system would be unusable for inbound calls.

Night service would redirect after-hours calls to a desk where personnel remained on duty overnight, such as a night watchman's duty station or a commercial answering service. An automated attendant may also be used to retain inbound calling to individual extensions after a live attendant goes off duty.
