= Centrex =

Telephone exchange service

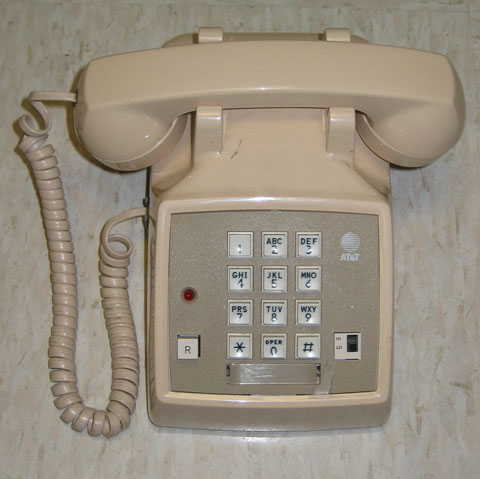
Typical standard phone used with Centrex. Note the "Recall" button and the Message Waiting Lamp.

Centrex is a portmanteau of central exchange, a kind of telephone exchange. It provides functions similar to a PBX, but is provisioned with equipment owned by, and located at, the telephone company premises.

Centrex service was first installed in the early 1960s in New York's financial district by New York Telephone. As of 2003, it was estimated that there were 20 million Centrex lines installed worldwide by 20 telephone companies, with the most installations in the United States (15 million), Canada (2 million), and the United Kingdom (1 million). This accounted for approximately 5% of all installed business telephone lines, worldwide.

In terms of user-visible features, Centrex and PBX are similar. Features include:

- Direct inward dialing (DID)
- Automatic routing of calls to obtain lowest cost
- Call pick-up groups
- Call forwarding
- Conference calling
- Automatic call distribution (ACD)
- Call detail recording

== Phasing out ==
In the United States, the usage of Centrex lines has fallen from 16.5 million in 2002 to 10.7 million in 2008 as users transition to IP-PBX (through VoIP). Centrex continues to be used by large institutions, government agencies, and universities as most of the equipment has already been paid for, though leasing Centrex lines may be more expensive.
