= Speed dial =

Telephone function

Speed dial is a telephone function allowing the user to place a call by pressing a reduced number of keys. This function was particularly useful for phone users who dial certain numbers on a regular basis.

In most cases, the user stores these numbers in the phone's memory for future use. The speed dial numbers are usually accessed by pressing a predetermined key or keys on the phone, followed by a one or two-digit code which the user assigns to each number; however, for ease of use, on many systems a call may be placed by pressing and holding one key on the numeric keypad.

Speed dialing is also available via Custom Calling features from the Telephone Company's Central Office. The numbers are programmed by the subscriber through the standard telephone dial, and speed dial calls are placed by dialing simply the digit and waiting a few seconds on a standard rotary dial phone and an older 10 key Touch Tone phone, or by dialing the number and the # key to instantly connect the call on a modern 12 key Touch Tone phone.

Most mobile phones used to have a contact list feature which provides similar abilities although most now have an instant call button which only requires one click.

== History ==
The capability for speed dial historically dates at least as far back as the Number One Electronic Switching System (1ESS) in 1965. Other early "instant dialers" dating back to 1972 also included punched card machines and magnetic tape machines.

Metal–oxide–semiconductor (MOS) integrated circuit (IC) telephone technology enabled speed dialing on push-button telephones in the early 1970s. MOS memory chips were used to store phone numbers, which could then be used for speed dialing at the push of a button. This was demonstrated by the British companies Pye TMC, Marconi-Elliott and GEC in 1970.

Between 1971 and 1973, the American company Bell Laboratories developed a push-button MOS telephone called the "Touch-O-Matic" phone, which could store up to 32 phone numbers. This was made possible by the low cost, low power requirements, small size, and high reliability of MOS transistors, over 15,000 of which were contained on ten IC chips, including one chip for logic, one for the dial interface, and eight for memory.

During the late 20th century, speed dial functionality was incorporated into digital telephone systems and private branch exchange (PBX) systems, allowing businesses to program internal speed dial codes for frequently dialed contacts. As mobile phones became more common in the 1990s and early 2000s, manufacturers introduced dedicated speed dial keys and voice-activated dialing.

With the advent of smartphones, speed dial evolved into "favorites" or "quick dial" functions within contact applications, reducing the need for manually programmed speed dial codes. Some smartphone models and operating systems allow users to set up widgets or voice commands for instant dialing.

== Modern usage ==
Although traditional speed dial functions are less common in modern smartphones, the concept remains widely used through voice assistants such as Siri, Google Assistant, and Amazon Alexa, which allow users to call contacts with voice commands. Many modern VoIP systems and cloud-based communication platforms also incorporate speed dialing features, often allowing users to assign speed dial numbers to contacts within a digital interface.

Businesses and call centers frequently use speed dialing in their telephony systems to improve efficiency, often integrating it with customer relationship management (CRM) software to streamline outbound calls.

== See also ==
- Abbreviated dialing
- Speed calling
- Auto dialer
- Voice dialing
- Predictive dialing
