= Automatic ring back =

Automatic ring back is a service offered by phone companies.

On making a telephone call to a number that is engaged, automatic ring back is a service provided by the telephone company whereby, when the called number becomes available, the caller is rung back, usually with a distinctive "ring back" ring. When the phone is picked up, it calls the previously engaged number. The service is typically invoked by keying a number on hearing the engaged tone.

In the UK the service is also known as Ringback.

In the United States the service is often called Auto Redial.

In the United States Army on post wide communications networks, this is referred to as Callback or Automatic Callback.

== See also ==
- Callback
- Camp-on busy signal
- Vertical service code
