= Line hunting =

Methodology of distributing phone calls from a single telephone number

In telephony, line hunting (or hunt group) is the method of distributing phone calls from a single telephone number to a group of several phone lines. Specifically, it refers to the process or algorithm used to select which line will receive the call.

Hunt groups are supported by some PBX phone systems. Also, some phone companies will provide this feature for a small fee (see also: Centrex). In the tariffs of some telephone companies, one may obtain hunting for free, but forward on busy is a charged service.

== Multi-line hunting ==
Multiline hunting (sometimes MLH, line hunting or MHG, multiline hunting group) is a feature that allows multiple telephone lines going into a business to act as a single group, called a hunt group. This type of fallback is a somewhat more complex form of call forwarding. If the line called is busy, the call goes to the next available line. Only if no lines in the group are open does the calling party get a busy signal.

== Linear hunting ==
In linear hunting, calls are always delivered to the lowest-numbered available line. This is also referred to as serial hunting or terminal hunting. It resembles busy/no-answer call forwarding. Calls are always delivered to the first line, unless it is busy—then the second, third, and remaining lines are considered in succession.

This configuration is most often found on multi-line phones found at small businesses. For automatic call distributor systems with high call volumes, this is usually the least preferable method, because calls will arrive at destinations that are in the process of completing the previous call, and depending on the circumstances, may be the least prepared to take the call.

Linear hunting can also cause problems in automated equipment that answers calls, particularly if a destination extension fails on a lower-numbered line. This extension will disrupt a disproportionately high percentage of the incoming calls, whereas circular hunting will spread that disruption evenly throughout all the calls, minimizing the possibility for a major disruption.

== Circular hunting ==
In circular hunting, the calls are distributed "round-robin". If a call is delivered to line 1, the next call goes to 2, the next to 3. The succession throughout each of the lines continues even if one of the previous lines becomes free. When the end of the hunt group is reached, the hunting starts over at the first line. Lines are skipped only if they are still busy on a previous call.

Circular hunting is a good way to distribute calls to electronic answering equipment such as fax machines.

== Most-idle hunting ==
In most-idle hunting, calls are always delivered to whichever line has been idle the longest. This considers the length of time that the calltaker has been busy versus available. This is typically used in call centers where the calls are being answered by people, to distribute the load evenly.

== See also ==
- Anycast
- Call forwarding
- Call whisper
- Follow-me
