= Malicious caller identification =

Type of enhanced telephone service

Malicious caller identification, introduced in 1992 as call trace, is activated by the vertical service code *57 ("star fifty-seven"), and is an upcharge fee subscription service offered by telephone company providers which, when dialed immediately after a malicious call, records metadata for police follow-up. Generally, law enforcement will only act on the trace once a formal police report has been filed in regard to the call.

Malicious caller identification, when subscribed or enabled, works by allowing a phone call recipient to mark or flag the preceding phone call connection as malicious (i.e. harassing, threatening, obscene, etc.). The phone system will then automatically trace the call by flagging station to station billing and routing data including start and end times. The call trace is not dependent upon call duration (as envisioned in dramatic movie plots) and will record all meta-data regardless of source conditions—even if the call was made from an unlisted number, a payphone or a number with caller identification disabled. To protect privacy the resulting trace data is only made available to law enforcement.

How the user activates this feature depends on their phone system—generally it is either in-band-signaling DTMF sequence such as the *57 vertical service code or a special button attached to their phone generating an out-of-band signal. For analog services, many exchanges will interpret DTMF sequences to activate POTS. Digital services, such as ISDN or GSM, enable the customer-premises equipment (CPE) to activate malicious caller identification via out-of-band signaling.
