= Call pickup =

Call pick-up is a feature used in a telephone system that allows one to answer someone else's telephone call. The feature is accessed by pressing a pre-programmed button (usually labelled "Pick-Up"), or by pressing a special sequence of buttons on the telephone set.

In places where call pick-up is used, the telephone sets may be divided into zones. Under such an arrangement, using call pick-up will only pick up a call in the same zone.

Call pick-up can be directed. Directed call pick-up is used for picking up a call that is ringing at a specific extension number; this feature is accessed through a different sequence of buttons than normal call pick-up.

A telephone set can only pick up one call at one time. If there are many incoming calls at the same time, call pick-up will pick up the call that rang first unless the pick-up is directed.

== Uses of call pickup ==
- If a colleague's telephone set is ringing, one can answer that call by picking up one's own set and then using the call pick-up feature, instead of walking to the colleague's desk.
- Call pickup is often used in workgroup settings, for example offices that answer customer enquiries. In such settings, the service may be called "group call pickup" and it usually does not matter who picks up a call.
- Call pickup is also useful in large offices or in slack periods when fewer staff are present than telephone sets.

== See also ==
- Private branch exchange
- Telephone exchange
