= Traffic pumping =

Practice to inflate the number of incoming calls

Traffic pumping, also known as access stimulation, is a controversial practice by which some local exchange telephone carriers in rural areas of the United States inflate the volume of incoming calls to their networks over what would naturally occur, and profit from the greatly increased intercarrier compensation fees to which they are entitled by the Telecommunications Act of 1996.

== Definition ==
Under the regulatory mechanisms of the Telecommunications Act of 1996, wireless and long-distance carriers including AT&T, Sprint, T-Mobile US, and Verizon, pay access fees to local exchange carriers (LECs) for calls to those carriers' subscribers. The FCC permits rural carriers to charge substantially higher access fees than carriers in urban areas, based on the rationale that they must pay for substantial fixed infrastructure costs while handling lower call volume.

Increasing the incoming call volume to those rural areas, and thereby their earnings from fees, rural carriers partner with certain telephone service providers to route their calls through the rural carrier. These services typically include phone sex and conference call providers, which expect a high volume of incoming calls. Notably these service providers do not need to establish a physical, local presence for routing these calls. As a result of this arrangement, the rural carriers can receive millions of dollars in fees, which they share with the service providers.

Payment for inbound long-distance calls to small rural telephone companies is normally handled through a shared pool, the National Exchange Carrier Association ("NECA"). Individual telcos are free to opt out of this process. For two years after opting out, they may bill interexchange carriers directly at a (comparatively high) rate of five to thirteen cents per minute. After two years the carrier must either rejoin the NECA pool, provide evidence to support continuing to charge the high rate, or reduce rates to a level that can be supported. An increase in inbound calling volume at about the same time as a telephone company leaves the NECA pool can therefore represent a profitable two years for that firm.

The numbers used for the service belong to a competitive local exchange carrier or independent telephone company and may be located in a rural numbering plan area in a sparsely populated state, such as area code 218 in northern Minnesota or area code 712 in western Iowa.

=== Voice over IP ===
In 2006, various startup companies began to offer voice over IP or Internet fax services which purported to be "free"; the companies operated from Iowa or used Iowa local numbers. One such service, callchinaforfree.com invited users to call a number in Iowa's area code 641 to reach a voice-over-Internet gateway from which calls could be made to China (country code +86) at no additional cost. Another, talkdigits.com, operated under multiple names (FreeDigits, TalkDigits, OfficeDigits, FaxDigits, ClickDigits, and SIPnumber) to offer a "free US phone number" to receive "free inbound calls" and voicemail or "free fax service" with "unlimited incoming faxes" which would then be delivered outside the region via broadband Internet.

By 2007, calls ceased being placed to China for the price of a call to rural Iowa as AT&T disputed millions of dollars' worth of calls. By 2008, the offer of a free Iowa number for inbound Internet voice and fax calls had been withdrawn, and the site talkdigits.com is now defunct and no longer accessible.

== Consequences ==
End-users of traffic-pumped phone services often do not pay directly for the high fees collected by rural local carriers and service providers. Many wireless and land line customers now have unlimited long-distance plans, and thus the entire cost of using these services is borne by their long-distance carrier. Providers of traffic-pumped conference calling services assert that these long-distance carriers still profit when their customers use the services.

In 2007, AT&T estimated that it would spend an additional $250 million to connect such calls, and has warned that it may have to raise its customers' calling plan prices unless regulators address the issue of traffic pumping. However, providers of traffic-pumped conference calls claim that AT&T has refused to provide evidence of these costs, and that it is a ploy by AT&T to leverage its market power to put competing conference calling providers out of business.

AT&T and other long-distance carriers have in some cases attempted to avoid these costs by blocking their customers from calling the phone numbers of traffic-pumping services. However the FCC has forbidden common carriers from using this kind of selective blocking, and so the long-distance carriers are essentially obligated to complete these calls.

Based upon an independent study of 50% of long-distance calls originating on wireless networks in the US, calls terminating to local carriers meeting a traffic pumping profile were estimated to cost $95 million annually, representing 11% of all long-distance costs in the study. Extending to all wireless service providers, the cost is estimated to be more than $190 million annually.

=== Role in dispute between AT&T and Google ===
The Google Voice telecommunications service offers a service similar to long-distance telephone calling at no cost, using VoIP to connect users with their calling destinations. In order to avoid paying high connection fees to traffic-pumping carriers, Google Voice blocked calls to some of these carriers. As of 2014, Google Voice no longer blocks calls to these carriers, but charges its users a fee to reach them (while not charging for other calls to US phone numbers).

AT&T has appealed to the FCC to intervene, charging that Google Voice ought to be required to connect these calls just as plain old telephone service (POTS) carriers are required to do so. Google has responded that its service, and those of VoIP providers such as Skype, is distinct from those of a traditional POTS common carrier, and that it should not be obligated to complete these calls. Google further charges that AT&T is trying to distract the FCC from concerns regarding network neutrality, and accuses AT&T of conducting regulatory capitalism, in which businesses exploit laws and regulations to stifle competition and slow innovation. Finally, Google urged the FCC to revise "outdated carrier compensation rules" to end the practice of traffic pumping.

AT&T has written to the FCC, saying that Google's blocking of calls to traffic pumping numbers gives it a substantial cost advantage over traditional carriers. AT&T further argued that the issue of network neutrality is highly relevant, since Google is violating its own statement of the principle of non-discrimination, that "a provider 'cannot block fair access' to another provider." AT&T agrees with Google that the FCC should act to forbid traffic pumping schemes in the first place, calling them "patently unlawful", but asks that Google be required to accept the same common carrier requirements even if they are not shut down.

A bipartisan group of U.S. Representatives has joined in AT&T's complaint, urging the FCC to investigate Google Voice's practice of blocking calls to high-fee rural local exchange carriers. Some of the legislators have received significant campaign contributions from AT&T, and represent districts where rural carriers profit from traffic pumping. Sam Gustin of DailyFinance suggests that there may be issues of conflict of interest and pork barrel politics involved in these legislators' efforts.

== Legal rulings ==
=== State administrative commission rulings ===
The Iowa Utilities Board issued a final order in 2009 in a complaint proceeding brought by Qwest and intervened in by AT&T and Sprint Nextel against eight rural telephone companies in Iowa. Except for one call blocking finding against Sprint, the decision was unfavorable for the rural carriers, which may have to return the fees they received for calls directed to traffic-pumped services by Iowa residents. However damages were not assessed and the Iowa Utilities Board does not have jurisdiction over the vast majority of disputed calls—those that were directed to Iowa from callers in other states—so the reach of its decision is limited. Moreover, the Board has indicated that it is reconsidering its decision and several appeals have been filed challenging the lawfulness of the Board's order, thus it is not yet a final decision.

The FCC subsequently issued a ruling in 2009 on this case.

=== Federal Communications Commission administrative rulings ===
In 1996, AT&T filed a Section 208 complaint with the FCC against Jefferson Telephone Company, a rural incumbent local exchange carrier (ILEC) based in Iowa, which entered into a commercial agreement with a chat line provider. AT&T's complaint alleged that Jefferson violated Section 201(b) of the Communications Act of 1934 because it "acquired a direct interest in promoting the delivery of calls to specific telephone numbers." AT&T also argued that the access revenue-sharing arrangement with the chat-line provider was unreasonably discriminatory in violation of Section 202(a) of the Act, because Jefferson did not share revenues with all its customers. The FCC rejected both these arguments and denied AT&T's complaint.

In 2002, the FCC issued two more orders denying similar complaints by AT&T directed at LECs that shared access revenues with chat-line providers. In AT&T v. Frontier Communications, the Commission rejected AT&T's allegations that revenue-sharing arrangements constituted unreasonable discrimination in violation of Section 202(a) or violations of the ILECs' common carrier duties under Section 201(b). In AT&T v. Beehive Telephone, the FCC again denied AT&T's complaint against a LEC that engaged in a commercial relationship with a chat-line provider for the same reasons.

The FCC has more recently issued an order in a case involving an Iowa carrier relating to interstate calls (calls made from any state other than Iowa to an Iowa telephone number). In the order, the FCC determined that the Iowa carrier was not entitled to collect the entire amounts it billed to the long-distance carrier, but that it was nevertheless entitled to some compensation. The exact amount of payment has not yet been fixed by the FCC.

== State legislation ==
Several long-distance carriers lobbied the South Dakota legislature to propose legislation forbidding rural telephone carriers from entering into revenue-sharing agreements with traffic-pumped services. However the legislation was defeated.

== See also ==
- Deregulation
- Rent seeking
