= Camp-on busy signal =

Telecommunications term

In telecommunications, the term camp-on busy signal has the following meanings:

- A signal that informs a busy telephone user that another call originator is waiting for a connection. Synonym: call waiting
- A teleprinter exchange facility signal that automatically causes a calling station to retry the call-receiver number after a given interval when the call-receiver teleprinter is occupied or the circuits are busy. Synonym: speed-up tone

This article incorporates public domain material from Federal Standard 1037C. General Services Administration. Archived from the original on 2022-01-22.
