= Anonymous call rejection =

Network software function that screens out calls without caller ID

In many voice telephone networks, anonymous call rejection (ACR) is a calling feature that automatically rejects incoming calls from callers who have blocked their caller ID information. Some telecommunications companies may include this service as standard, while others may require a subscription and others still do not offer it at all. On traditional landlines in the North American Numbering Plan, the feature is enabled with the vertical service code *77, and disabled with *87.

The caller usually hears a voice message explaining that their call cannot be connected unless they display their number. Or, some networks allow users to forward anonymous calls directly to voicemail.

The service, together with caller ID, became possible with the introduction of digital switching technologies to landline telephone services, which became widespread in many countries throughout the 1980s and 1990s.

In a digital public switched telephone network (PSTN), it could be implemented directly in software running on local switching systems or, more commonly, as part of a suite of facilities supported by an additional layer known as the Intelligent Network (IN). This allowed more advanced, software based, services to be rolled out in public telephone networks using dedicated intelligent nodes, operating in conjunction with, but independently of switching systems.

As voice telephony continues evolve ACR remains available on modern and can be relatively easily implemented in VoIP based services and is also available on some mobile networks.

On more modern landline services, particularly those using VoIP, ACR is sometimes activated and deactivated using a Web interface, rather than by dialling codes.

== See also ==
- Automatic number identification
- Pat Fleet, the voice behind some rejection messages
