= Business telephone system =

Telephone system typically used in business environments

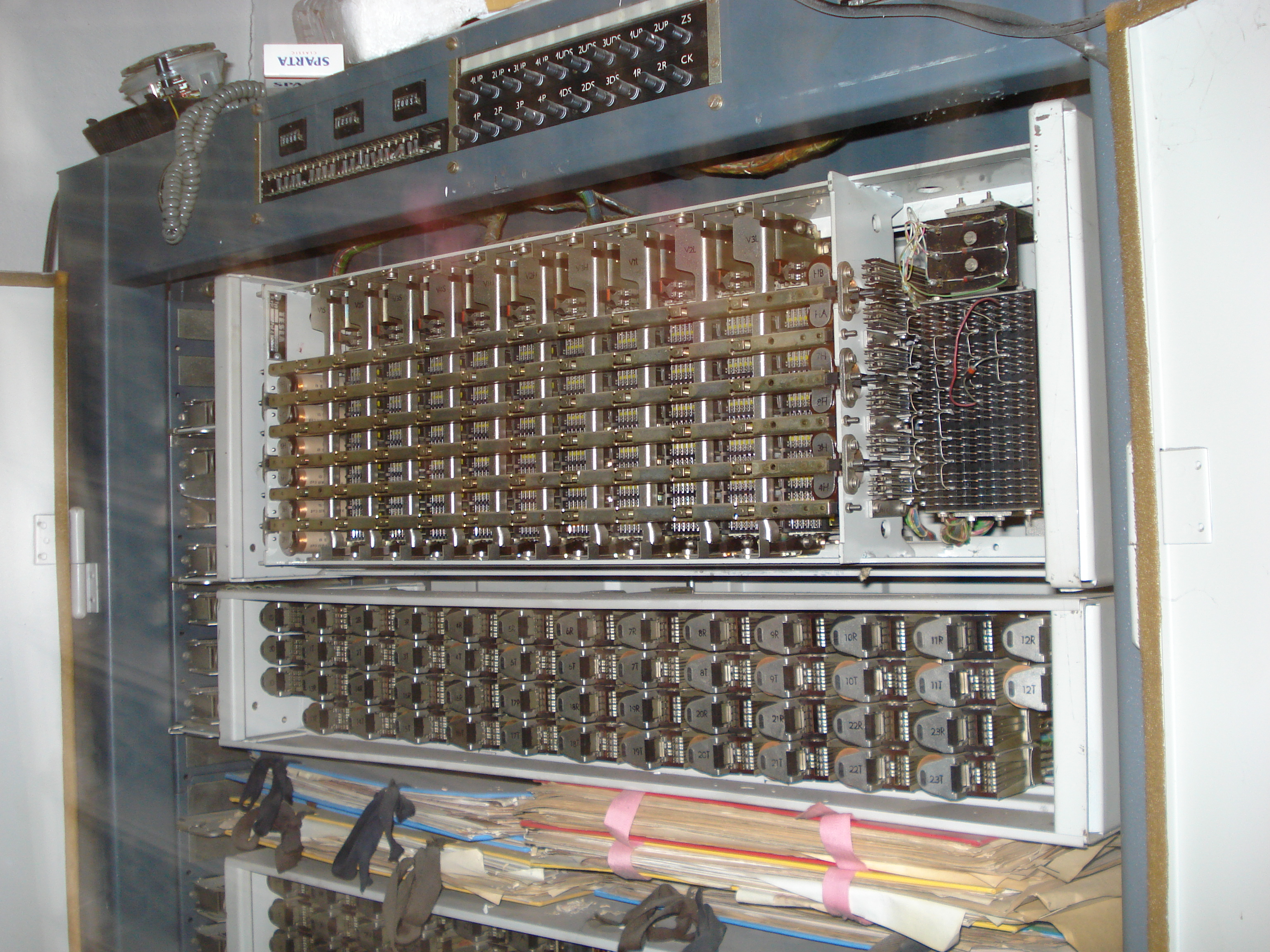
Early-1970s Telephone Exchange model TESLA Automatic system

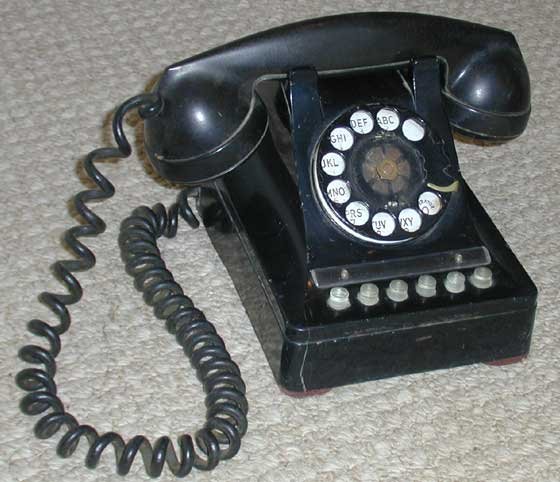
Early model 464G Western Electric key telephone set

A business telephone system is a telephone system typically used in business environments, encompassing the range of technology from the key telephone system (KTS) to the private branch exchange (PBX).

A business telephone system differs from an installation of several telephones with multiple central office (CO) lines in that the CO lines used are directly controllable in key telephone systems from multiple telephone stations, and that such a system often provides additional features for call handling. Business telephone systems are often broadly classified into key telephone systems and private branch exchanges, but many combinations (hybrid telephone systems) exist.

A key telephone system was originally distinguished from a private branch exchange in that it did not require an operator or attendant at a switchboard to establish connections between the central office trunks and stations, or between stations. Technologically, private branch exchanges share lineage with central office telephone systems, and in larger or more complex systems, may rival a central office system in capacity and features. With a key telephone system, a station user could control the connections directly using line buttons, which indicated the status of lines with built-in lamps.

== Key telephone system ==
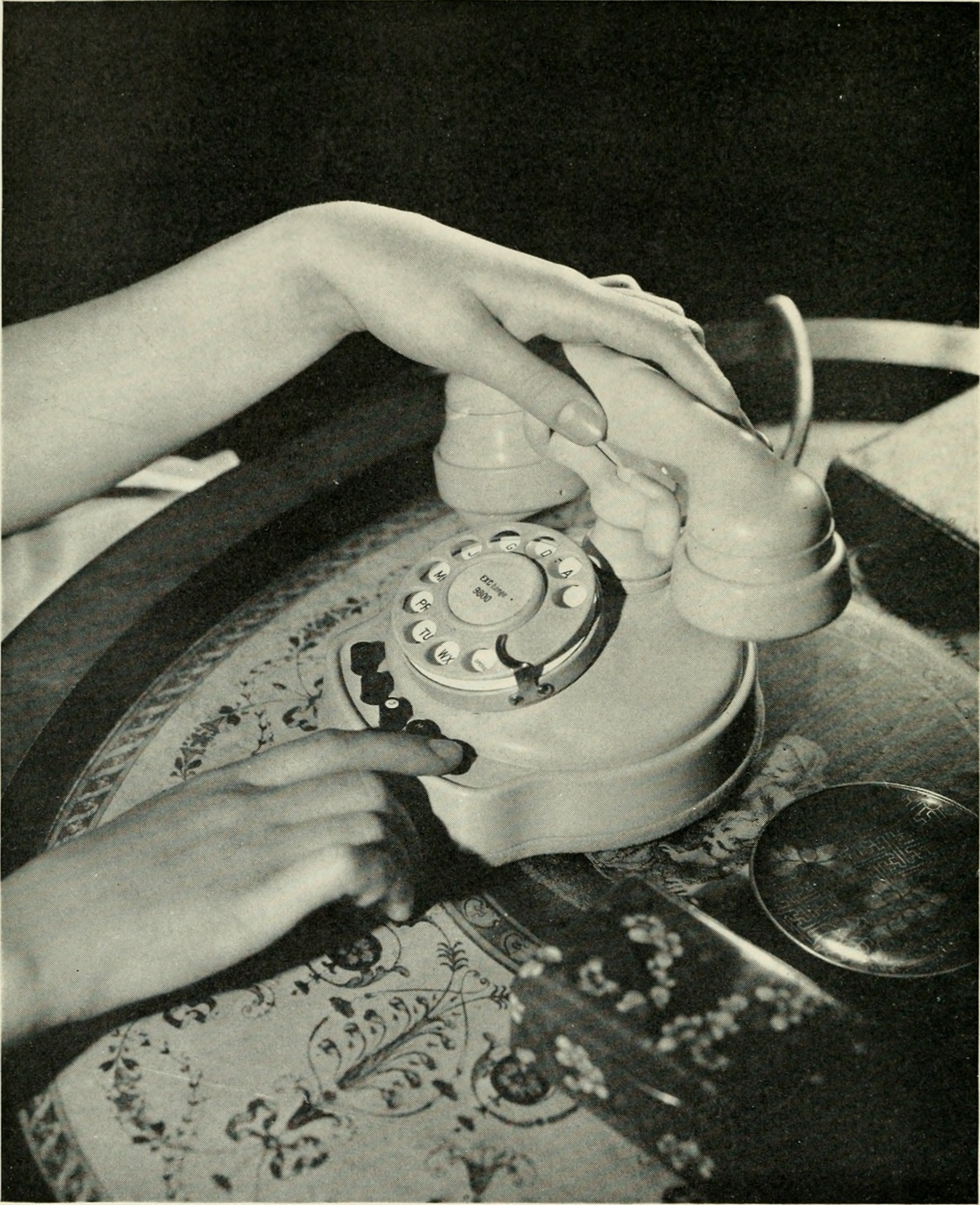
A 1930s key telephone for a private branch exchange

Key telephone systems are primarily defined by arrangements with individual line selection buttons for each available telephone line. The earliest systems were known as wiring plans and simply consisted of telephone sets, keys, lamps, and wiring.

Key was a Bell System term of art for a customer-controlled switching system such as the line buttons on the phones associated with such systems. The electrical components that allow for the selection of lines and features such as hold and intercom are housed in a panel or cabinet, called the key service unit or key system unit (KSU).

The wiring plans evolved into modular hardware building blocks with a variety of functionality and services in the 1A key telephone system developed in the Bell System in the 1930s.

Key systems can be built using three principal architectures: electromechanical shared-control, electronic shared-control, or independent key sets.

New installations of key telephone systems have become less common, as hybrid systems and private branch exchanges of comparable size have similar costs and greater functionality.

=== Electromechanical shared-control key system ===
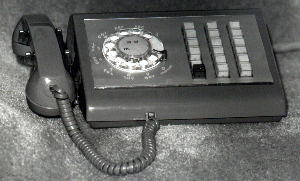
A typical rotary-dial key telephone: the Western Electric eighteen-button Call Director, manufactured from 1958 to the early 1980s

Before the development of large-scale integrated circuits, key systems typically consisted of electromechanical components, such as relays, as were larger telephone switching systems.

The systems marketed in North America as the 1A, 1A1, 1A2 Key System, and the 6A, are typical examples and were sold for many decades. The Western Electric 1A family of key telephone units (KTUs) was introduced in the late 1930s and remained in use until the 1950s. 1A equipment was primitive and required at least two KTUs per line; one for line termination and one for station (telephone instrument) termination. The telephone instrument commonly used by 1A systems was the WECo 300/400-series telephone. Introduced in 1953, 1A1 key systems simplified wiring with a single KTU for both line and station termination, and increased the features available. As the 1A1 systems became commonplace, requirements for intercom features grew. The original intercom KTUs, WECo Model 207, were wired for a single talk link, that is, a single conversation on the intercom at a time. The WECo 6A dial intercom system provided two talk links and was often installed as the dial intercom in a 1A1 or 1A2 key system. The 6A systems were complex, troublesome, and expensive, and never became popular. The advent of 1A2 technology in 1964 simplified key system setup and maintenance. These continued to be used throughout the 1980s when the arrival of electronic key systems with their easier installation and greater features signaled the end of electromechanical key systems.

Two lesser-known key systems were used at airports for air traffic control communications, the 102 and 302 key systems. These were uniquely designed for communications between the air traffic control tower and radar approach control (RAPCON) or ground control approach (GCA) and included radio line connections.

Automatic Electric Company also produced a family of key telephone equipment, some of it compatible with Western Electric equipment, but it did not gain the widespread use enjoyed by Western Electric equipment.

=== Electronic shared-control system ===
With the advent of LSI ICs, the same architecture could be implemented much less expensively than was possible using relays. In addition, it was possible to eliminate the many-wire cabling and replace it with much simpler cable similar to (or even identical to) that used by non-key systems. Electronic shared-control systems led quickly to the modern hybrid telephone system, as the features of PBXs and key systems quickly merged. One of the most recognized such systems is the AT&T Merlin.

Additionally, these more modern systems allowed a diverse set of features including:

- Answering machine functions
- Automatic call accounting
- Caller ID
- Remote supervision of the entire system
- Selection of signaling sounds
- Speed dialing
- Station-specific limitations (such as no long-distance access or no paging)

Features could be added or modified simply using software, allowing easy customization of these systems. The stations were easier to maintain than the previous electromechanical key systems, as they used efficient LEDs instead of incandescent light bulbs for line status indication.

LSI also allowed smaller systems to distribute the control (and features) into individual telephone sets that don't require any single shared control unit. Such systems were dubbed KSU-less; the first such phone was introduced in 1975 with the Com Key 416. Generally, these systems are used with relatively few telephone sets and it is often more difficult to keep the feature set (such as speed-dialing numbers) in synchrony between the various sets.

== Hybrid key telephone system ==
Into the 21st century, the distinction between key systems and PBX systems has become increasingly blurred. Early electronic key systems used dedicated handsets which displayed and allowed access to all connected PSTN lines and stations.

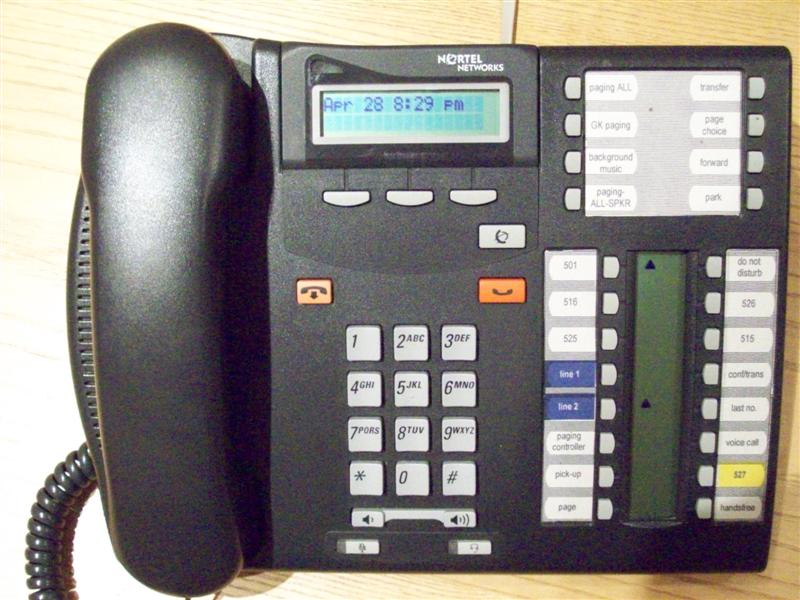
Nortel T Series Key System Telephone

The modern key system now supports SIP, ISDN, analog handsets (in addition to its own proprietary handsets – usually digital) as well as a raft of features more traditionally found on larger PBX systems. Their support for both analog and digital signaling, and of some PBX functionality gives rise to the hybrid designation.

A hybrid system typically has some call appearance buttons that directly correspond to individual lines and/or stations, but may also support direct dialing to extensions or outside lines without selecting a line appearance.

The modern key system is usually fully digital, although analog variants persist and some systems implement VOIP services. Effectively, the aspects that distinguish a PBX from a hybrid key system are the amount, scope, and complexity of the features and facilities offered.

== Private branch exchange ==
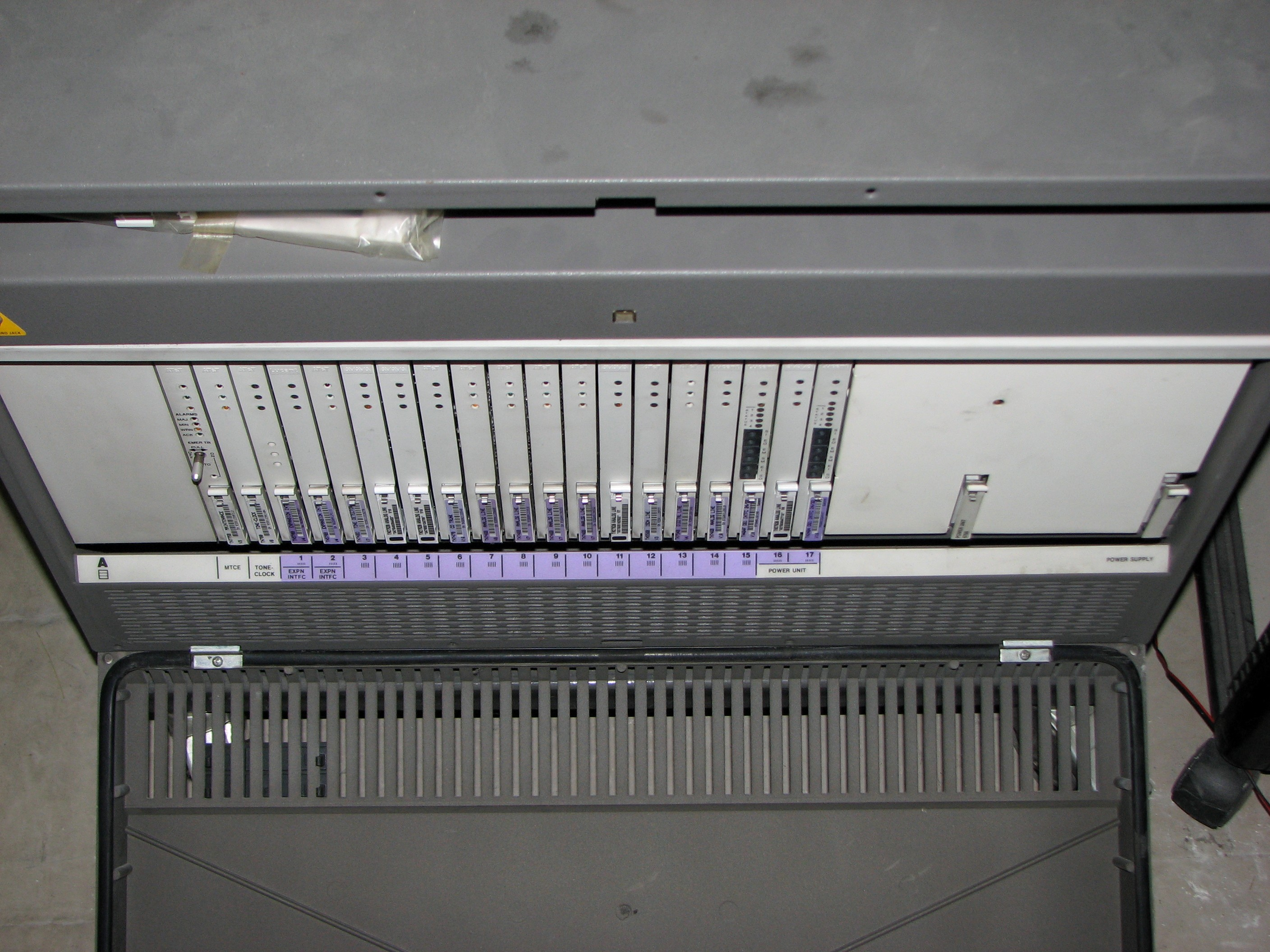
An Avaya G3si PBX with front cover removed (view from the top)

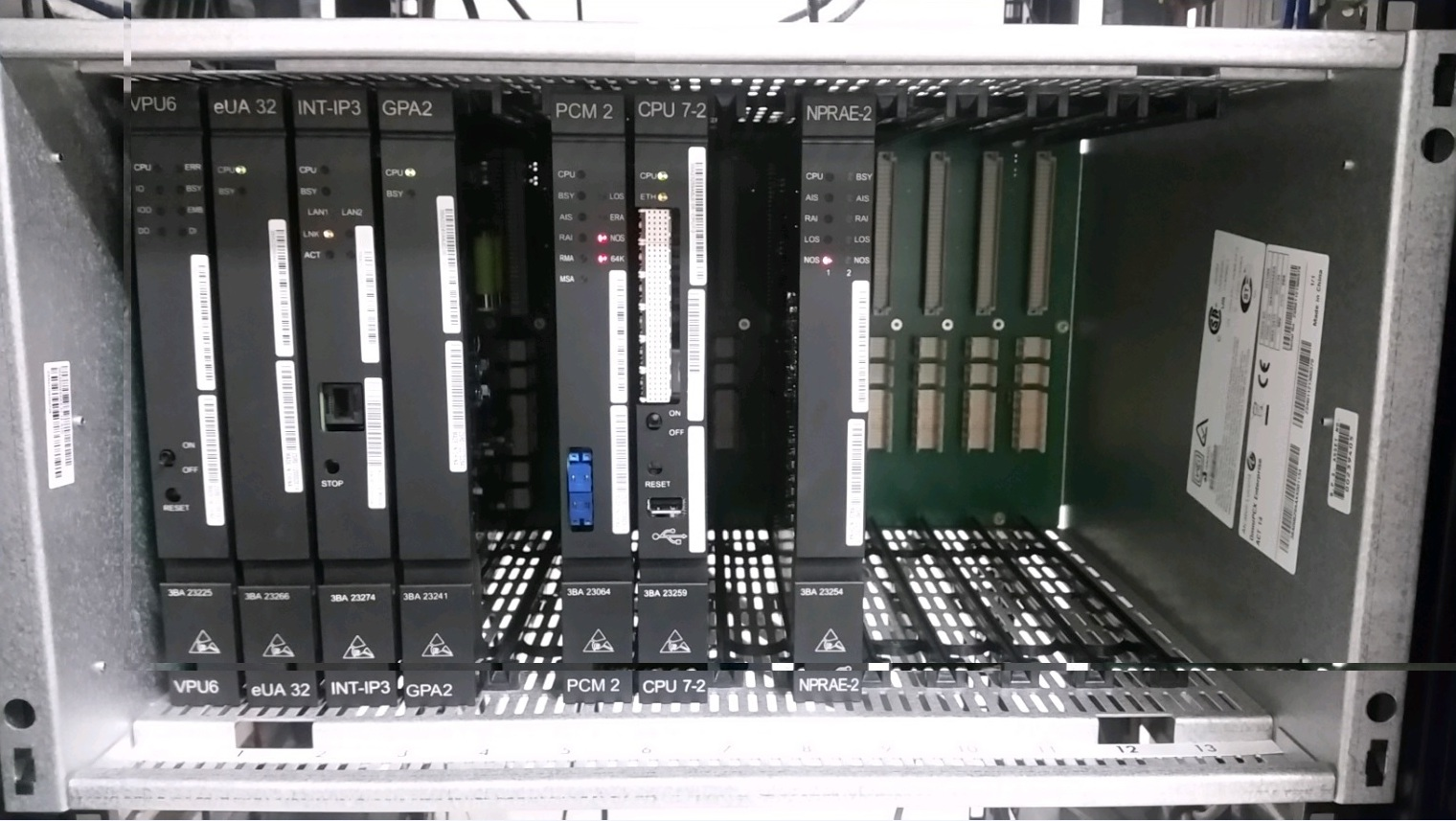
An Alcatel Lucent PABX Omni PCX Enterprise (front view)

A Private Branch Exchange (PBX) system is a private phone network that helps businesses manage calls. It allows employees to communicate internally and connect with external callers using the Public Switched Telephone Network (PSTN).

Without a PBX phone system, every employee would need a separate phone line. But with PBX, calls are routed efficiently, making communication smoother and business operations more organized. The central office lines provide connections to the public switched telephone network (PSTN) and the concentration aspect of a PBX permits the shared use of these lines between all stations in the organization. Its intercommunication ability allows two or more stations to directly connect while not using the public switched telephone network. This method reduces the number of lines needed from the organization to the public switched telephone network.

Each device connected to the PBX, such as a telephone, a fax machine, or a computer modem, is referred to as an extension and has a designated extension telephone number that may or may not be mapped automatically to the numbering plan of the central office and the telephone number block allocated to the PBX.

Initially, PBX systems offered the primary advantage of cost savings for internal phone calls: handling the circuit switching locally reduced charges for telephone service via central-office lines. As PBX systems gained popularity, they began to feature services not available in the public network, such as hunt groups, call forwarding, and extension dialing. From the 1960s, a simulated PBX, known as Centrex, provided similar features from the central telephone exchange.

A PBX differs from a key telephone system (KTS) in that users of a key system manually select their own outgoing lines on special telephone sets that control buttons for this purpose, while PBXs select the outgoing line automatically. The telephone sets connected to a PBX do not normally have special keys for central-office line control, but it is not uncommon for key systems to be connected to a PBX to extend its services.

A PBX, in contrast to a key system, employs an organizational numbering plan for its stations. In addition, a dial plan determines whether additional digit sequences must be prefixed when dialing to obtain access to a central office trunk. Modern number-analysis systems permit users to dial internal and external telephone numbers without special codes to distinguish the intended destination.

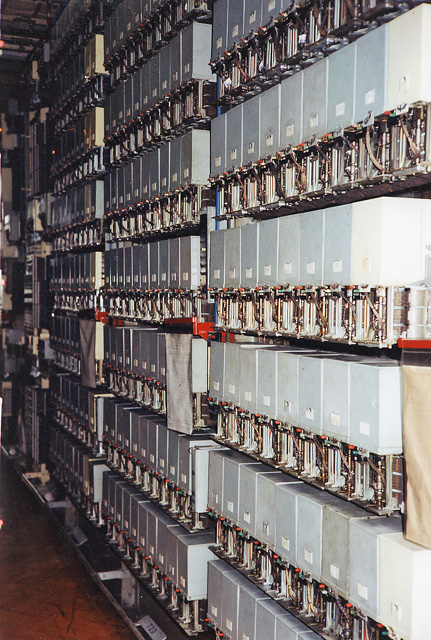
Racks of a Strowger telephone exchange from 1989, showing two-motion selectors, in the United Kingdom

=== History ===
The term PBX originated when switchboard operators managed company switchboards manually using cord circuits. As automated electromechanical switches and later electronic switching systems gradually replaced the manual systems, the terms private automatic branch exchange (PABX) and private manual branch exchange (PMBX) differentiated them. Solid-state digital systems were sometimes referred to as electronic private automatic branch exchanges (EPABX). As of 2021, the term PBX is by far the most widely recognized. The abbreviation now applies to all types of complex, in-house telephony switching systems.

Two significant developments during the 1990s led to new types of PBX systems. One was the massive growth of data networks and increased public understanding of packet switching. Companies needed packet-switched networks for data, so using them for telephone calls proved tempting, and the availability of the Internet as a global delivery system made packet-switched communications even more attractive. These factors led to the development of the voice over IP PBX, or IP PBX.

The other trend involved the idea of focusing on core competence. PBX services had always been hard to arrange for smaller companies, and many companies realized that handling their own telephony was not their core competence. These considerations gave rise to the concept of the hosted PBX. In wireline telephony, the original hosted PBX was the Centrex service provided by telcos since the 1960s; later competitive offerings evolved into the modern competitive local exchange carrier. In voice-over IP, hosted solutions are easier to implement as the PBX may be located at and managed by any telephone service provider, connecting to the individual extensions via the Internet. The upstream provider no longer needs to run direct, local leased lines to the served premises.

==== Manual PBX ====
Many manufacturers provided manually operated private branch exchange systems in various sizes and features; examples are pictured here:

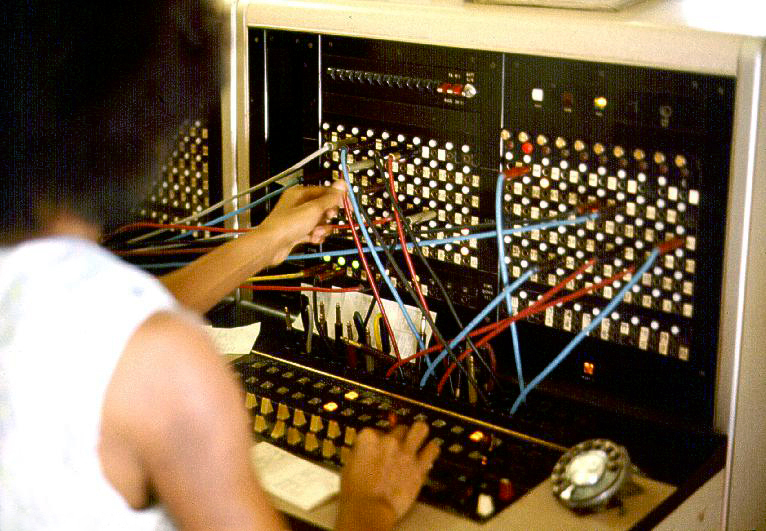
Cord PBX switchboard (c. 1975)

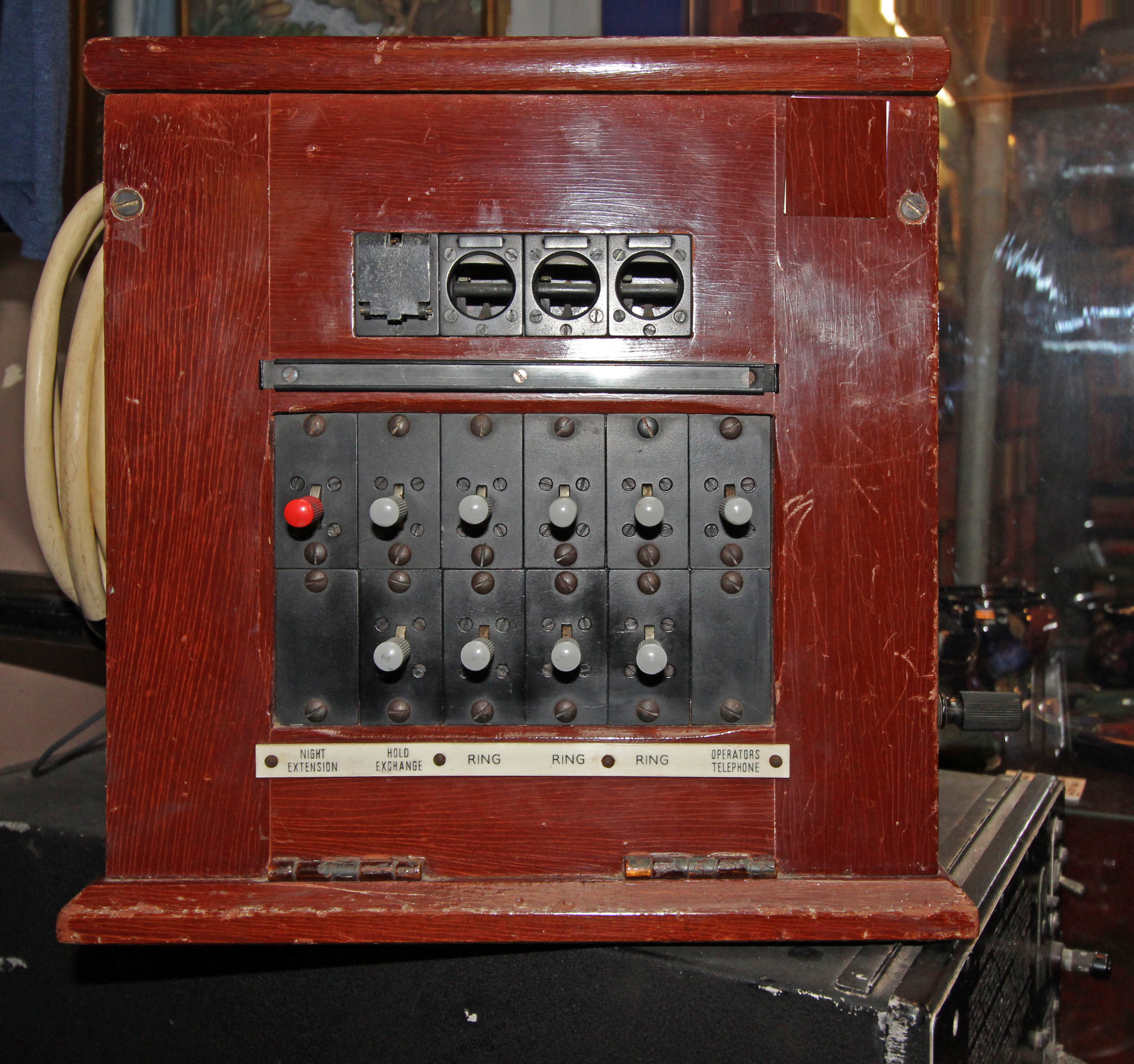
Early 1945 telephone exchange model N935 system featuring cordless operation

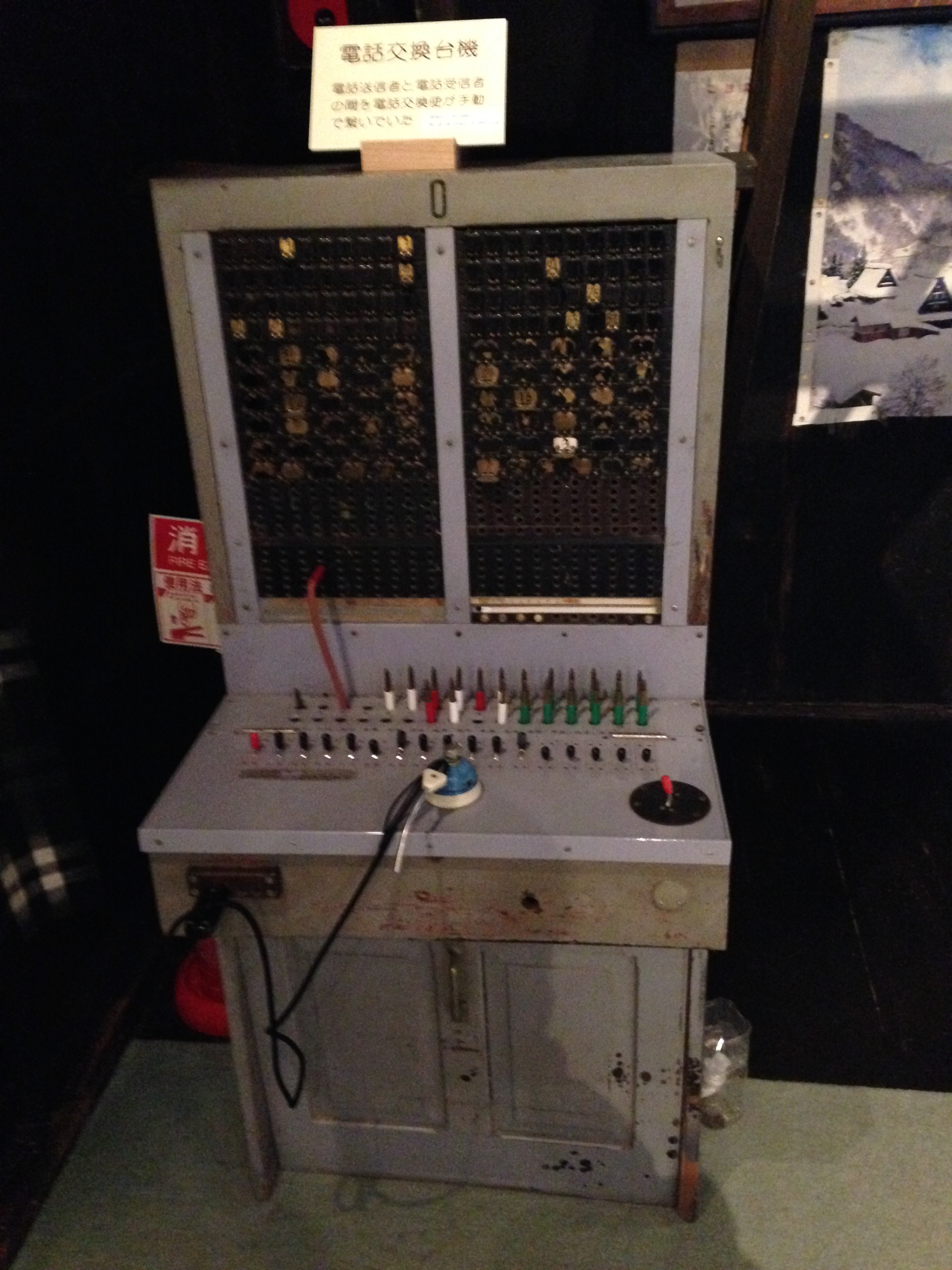
Manual cord telephone exchange exhibited in Ainokura Traditional Industry Museum in Japan

=== System components ===
A PBX system often includes the following:

- Cabinets, closets, vaults, and other housings
- Console or switchboard allowing an operator to control incoming calls
- Interconnecting wires and cables
- Logic cards, switching and control cards, power cards, and related devices that facilitate PBX operation
- Microcontroller or microcomputer for arbitrary data processing, control and logic
- Outside trunks connecting the PBX to the public switched telephone network
- Stations, or telephone sets, sometimes called lines by metonymy
- The PBX's internal switching network
- Uninterruptible power supply (UPS) consisting of sensors, power switches, and batteries

=== Current trends ===
Since the advent of Internet telephony (Voice over IP) technologies, PBX development has tended toward the IP PBX, which uses the Internet Protocol to carry calls. Most modern PBXs support VoIP. ISDN PBX systems also replaced some traditional PBXs in the 1990s, as ISDN offers features such as conference calling, call forwarding, and programmable caller ID. As of 2015, ISDN is being phased out by most major telecommunication carriers throughout Europe in favor of all-IP networks, with some expecting complete migration by 2025. Originally having started as an organization's manual switchboard or attendant console operated by a telephone operator or just simply the operator, PBXs have evolved into VoIP centers that are hosted by the operators or even manufacturers.

Even though VoIP is considered by many people as the future of telephony, the circuit switched network remains the core of communications, and the existing PBX systems are competitive in services with modern IP systems. Five distinct scenarios exist:

- Hosted/virtual PBX (hosted and circuit-switched) or traditional Centrex
- IP Centrex or hosted/virtual IP (hosted and packet-switched)
- IP PBX (private and packet-switched)
- Mobile PBX solution (mobile phones replacing or used in combination with fixed phones)
- PBX (private and circuit-switched)

For the option to call from the IP network to the circuit-switched PSTN (SS7/ISUP), the hosted solutions include interconnecting media gateways.

=== Home and small-business usage ===
Historically, the expense of full-fledged PBX systems has put them out of reach of small businesses and individuals. However, since the 1990s many small, consumer-grade, and consumer-size PBXs have become available. These systems are not comparable in size, robustness, or flexibility to commercial-grade PBXs, but still provide many features.

The first consumer PBX systems used analog (POTS) telephone lines, typically supporting four private analog and one public analog line. They were the size of a small cigar box. In Europe, these systems for analog phones were followed by consumer-grade PBXs for ISDN. Using small PBXs for ISDN is a logical step since the ISDN basic rate interface provides two logical phone lines (via two ISDN B channels) that can be used in parallel. With the adoption of VoIP by consumers, consumer VoIP PBXs have appeared, with PBX functions becoming simple additional software features of consumer-grade routers and switches. Additionally, many telecommunications providers now offer hosted PBX systems where the provider actually hosts the PBX and the phone handsets are connected to it through an internet connection.

Open source projects have provided PBX-style features since the 1990s. These projects provide flexibility, features, and programmability.

=== PBX functions ===
Functionally, the PBX performs four main call processing duties:

- Establishing connections (circuits) between the telephone sets of two users (e.g. mapping a dialed number to a physical phone, ensuring the phone isn't already busy)
- Maintaining such connections as long as the users require them (i.e. channeling voice signals between the users)
- Disconnecting those connections as per the user's requirement
- Providing information for accounting purposes (e.g. metering calls)

In addition to these basic functions, PBXs offer many other calling features and capabilities, with different manufacturers providing different features in an effort to differentiate their products. Common capabilities include (manufacturers may have a different name for each capability):

- Auto attendant
- Auto dialing
- Automated directory services (where callers can be routed to a given employee by keying or speaking the letters of the employee's name)
- Automatic call distributor
- Automatic ring back
- Busy override
- Call blocking
- Call forwarding on busy or absence
- Call logging
- Call park
- Call pick-up
- Call transfer
- Call waiting
- Call whisper
- Camp-on
- Conference call
- Custom greetings
- Customized abbreviated dialing (speed dialing)
- Direct inward dialing (DID)
- Direct inward system access (DISA) (the ability to access internal features from an outside telephone line)
- Do not disturb (DND)
- Follow-me, also known as find-me: Determines the routing of incoming calls. The exchange is configured with a list of numbers for a person. When a call is received for that person, the exchange routes it to each number on the list in turn until either the call is answered or the list is exhausted (at which point the call may be routed to a voice mail system).
- Interactive voice response
- Local connection: Another useful attribute of a hosted PBX is the ability to have a local number in cities in which you are not physically present. This service essentially lets you create a virtual office presence anywhere in the world.
- Music on hold
- Night service
- Public address voice paging
- Shared message boxes (where a department can have a shared voicemail box)
- Voice mail
- Voice message broadcasting
- Welcome message

=== Interface standards ===
Interfaces for connecting extensions to a PBX include:

- DECT – a standard for connecting cordless phones.
- Internet Protocol – For example, H.323 and SIP.
- POTS (plain old telephone service) – the common two-wire interface used in most homes. This is cheap and effective and allows almost any standard phone to be used as an extension.
- proprietary – the manufacturer has defined a protocol. One can only connect the manufacturer's sets to their PBX, but the benefit is more visible information displayed and/or specific function buttons.

Interfaces for connecting PBXs to each other include:

- DPNSS – for connecting PBXs to trunk lines. Standardized by British Telecom, this usually runs over E1 (E-carrier) physical circuits.
- Internet Protocol – H.323 and the Session Initiation Protocol (SIP) are IP-based solutions for multimedia sessions.
- Primary rate interface (ISDN) – Provided over T1 (23 bearer channels and 1 signaling channel) or E1 carriers.
- Proprietary protocols – if equipment from several manufacturers is on-site, the use of a standard protocol is required.
- QSIG – for connecting PBXs to each other, usually runs over T1 (T-carrier) or E1 (E-carrier) physical circuits.

Interfaces for connecting PBXs to trunk lines include:

- Internet Protocol – H.323, SIP, MGCP, and Inter-Asterisk eXchange protocols operate over IP and are supported by some network providers.
- ISDN – the most common digital standard for fixed telephony devices. This can be supplied in either Basic (2-circuit capacity) or Primary (24- or 30-circuit capacity) versions. Most medium to large companies would use Primary ISDN circuits carried on T1 or E1 physical connections.
- RBS (robbed-bit signaling) – delivers 24 digital circuits over a four-wire (T1) interface
- standard POTS (plain old telephone service) lines – the common two-wire interface used in most domestic homes. This is adequate only for smaller systems and can suffer from not being able to detect incoming calls when trying to make an outbound call (commonly called glare).

Interfaces for collecting data from the PBX:

- File – the PBX generates a file containing the call records from the PBX.
- Network port (listen mode) – an external application connects to the TCP or UDP port. The PBX streams information to the application.
- Network port (server mode) – the PBX connects to another application or buffer.
- Serial interface – historically used to print every call record to a serial printer. In modern systems, a software application connects via serial cable to this port.

A data record from a PBX or other telecommunication system that provides the statistics for a telephone call is usually termed a call detail record (CDR) or a Station Messaging Detail Record (SMDR).

=== Hosted PBX systems ===
A hosted PBX is a cloud-based phone system that is managed by a third-party provider. It eliminates the need for on-site hardware, offering a scalable solution that is ideal for businesses seeking a hands-off approach to telephony management. This means the customer does not need to buy or install PBX equipment. Generally, the service is provided by a lease agreement and the provider can, in some configurations, use the same switching equipment to service multiple hosted PBX customers.

The first hosted PBX services were feature-rich compared to most premises-based systems of the time. Some PBX functions, such as follow-me calling, appeared in a hosted service before they became available in hardware PBX equipment. Since its introduction, updates and new offerings have moved feature sets in both directions. It is possible to get hosted PBX services that include feature sets from minimal functionality to advanced feature combinations.

In addition to the features available from premises-based PBX systems, hosted PBX:

- allows a single number to be presented for the entire company, despite its being geographically distributed. A company could even choose to have no premises, with workers connected from home using their domestic telephones but receiving the same features as any PBX user.
- allows multimodal access, where employees access the network via a variety of telecommunications systems, including POTS, ISDN, cellular phones, and VOIP. This allows one extension to ring in multiple locations (either concurrently or sequentially).
- allows scalability so that a larger system is not needed if new employees are hired, and so that resources are not wasted if the number of employees is reduced.
- eliminates the need for companies to manage or pay for on-site hardware maintenance.
- supports integration with custom toll plans (that allow intra-company calls, even from private premises, to be dialed at a cheaper rate) and integrated billing and accounting (where calls made on a private line but on the company's behalf are billed centrally to the company).

=== Hosted PBX providers ===
The ongoing migration of most major telecommunication carriers to IP-based networks, coupled with the rise in Cloud Communications has resulted in a significant rise in the uptake of hosted PBX solutions.

==== Mobile PBX ====
A mobile PBX is a hosted PBX service that extends fixed-line PBX functionality to mobile devices such as cellular handsets, smartphones, and PDA phones by provisioning them as extensions. Mobile PBX services also can include fixed-line phones. Mobile PBX systems are different from other hosted PBX systems that simply forward data or calls to mobile phones by allowing the mobile phone itself, through the use of buttons, keys, and other input devices, to control PBX phone functions and to manage communications without having to call into the system first.

A mobile PBX may exploit the functionality available in smartphones to run custom applications to implement the PBX-specific functionality.

In addition, a mobile PBX may create extension identifiers for each handset that allow to dial other cell phones in the PBX via their extension shortcut, instead of a PSTN number.

==== IP-PBX ====
An IP PBX handles voice calls over the Internet Protocol (IP), bringing benefits for computer telephony integration (CTI). An IP-PBX can exist as physical hardware or can carry out its functions virtually, performing the call-routing activities of the traditional PBX or key system as a software system. The virtual version is also called a "Soft PBX".

== See also ==
- Centrex
- Circuit ID
- Cloud communications
- Ground start trunk
- List of SIP software
- Reference computer
- RJ21
- Switchboard operator
- Telephone exchange
- Telephone switchboards
