= Automated attendant =

Automated telephone exchange system

In telephony, an automated attendant (also auto attendant, auto-attendant, autoattendant, automatic phone menus, AA, or virtual receptionist) allows callers to be automatically transferred to an extension without the intervention of an operator/receptionist. Many AAs will also offer a simple menu system ("for sales, press 1, for service, press 2," etc.). An auto attendant may also allow a caller to reach a live operator by dialing a number, usually "0". Typically the auto attendant is included in a business's phone system such as a PBX, but some services allow businesses to use an AA without such a system. Modern AA services (which now overlap with more complicated interactive voice response or IVR systems) can route calls to mobile phones, VoIP virtual phones, other AAs/IVRs, or other locations using traditional land-line phones or voice message machines.

== Feature description ==
Telephone callers will recognize an automated attendant system as one that greets calls incoming to an organization with a recorded greeting of the form, "Thank you for calling .... If you know your party's extension, you may dial it any time during this message." Callers who have a touch-tone (DTMF) phone can dial an extension number or, in most cases, wait for operator ("attendant") assistance. Since the telephone network does not transmit the DC signals from rotary dial telephones (except for audible clicks), callers who have rotary dial phones have to wait for assistance.

On a purely technical level it could be argued that an automated attendant is a very simple kind of IVR however, in the telecom industry the terms IVR and auto attendant are generally considered distinct. An automated attendant serves a very specific purpose (replace live operator and route calls), whereas an IVR can perform all sorts of functions (telephone banking, account inquiries, etc.).

An AA will often include a directory which will allow a caller to dial by name in order to find a user on a system. There is no standard format to these directories, and they can use combinations of first name, last name, or both.

The following lists common routing steps that are components of an automated attendant:

- Transfer to extension
- Transfer to voicemail
- Play message (i.e., "our address is ...")
- Go to a sub-menu
- Repeat choices

In addition, an automated attendant would be expected to have values for the following:

- '0' – where to go when the caller dials '0'
- Timeout – what to do if the caller does nothing (usually go to the same place as '0')
- Default mailbox – where to send calls if '0' is not answered (or is not pointing to a live person)

== Background ==
PBXs (private branch exchanges) or PABXs (private automatic branch exchanges) are telephone systems that serve an organization that has many telephone extensions but fewer telephone lines (sometimes called "trunks") that connect that organization to the rest of the global telecommunications network.

While persons within an enterprise served by a PBX can call each other by dialing their extension numbers, incoming calls, i.e., calls originating from a telephone not served by the PBX but intended for a party served by the PBX, required assistance from a switchboard operator (also called a "switchboard attendant") or a telephone service called DID ("direct inward dialing"). Direct inward dialing has advantages such as rapid connection to the destination party and disadvantages including cost, lack of identification of the called organization and use of ten-digit telephone numbers.

Automated attendants provide, among many other things, a way for an external caller to be directed to an extension or department served by a PBX system without using direct inward dialing or without switchboard attendant assistance.

== History ==
Automated attendants are not part of voicemail systems. Voice messaging (or voicemail or VM) technology has existed since the late 1970s; in the early 1980s companies provided voice-prompting systems that allowed callers to reach (route the call) to an intended party, not necessarily to leave a message. Automated attendant systems are also referred to as automated menu systems and much early work in this field was done by Michael J. Freeman, Ph.D.

== Time-based routing ==
Many auto attendants will have options to allow for time-of-day routing, as well as weekend and holiday routing. The specifics of these features will depend entirely on the particular automated attendant, but typically there would be a normal greeting and routing steps that would take place during normal business hours, and a different greeting and routing for non-business hours.

== See also ==
- Call avoidance
- IVR
- Line hunting
- Call whisper
