= Call forwarding =

Redirection of a telephone call to another subscriber

Call forwarding, or call diversion, is a telephony feature of all telephone switching systems which redirects a telephone call to another destination, which may be, for example, a mobile or another telephone number where the desired called party is available. Call forwarding was invented by Ernest J. Bonanno.

In North America, the forwarded line usually rings once to remind the customer using call forwarding that the call is being redirected. More consistently, the forwarded line indicates its condition by stutter dial tone. Call forwarding typically can redirect incoming calls to any other domestic telephone number, but the owner of the forwarded line must pay any toll charges for forwarded calls. Call forwarding is often enabled by dialing *72 followed by the telephone number to which calls should be forwarded. Once someone answers, call forwarding is in effect. If no one answers or the line is busy, the dialing sequence must be repeated to effect call forwarding. Call forwarding is disabled by dialing *73. This feature requires a subscription from the telephone company. Also available in some areas is Remote Access to call forwarding, which permit the control over call forwarding from telephones other than the subscriber's telephone. VOIP and cable telephone systems also allow call forwarding to be set up and directed via their web portals. Call forwarding can be Conditional or Unconditional. Conditional call forwarding only works when the conditions set by the customers are met while Unconditional call forwarding works in all cases irrelevant of network coverage.

In Europe, most networks indicate that unconditional call forwarding is active with a special dial tone. When the phone is picked up it is immediately apparent that calls are being forwarded, while in other countries same system is being followed now.

== Terminology ==
The ISDN Diversion supplementary services standards document uses "diversion" as a general term to encompass specific features including "Call Forwarding Busy", "Call Forwarding No Reply" and "Call Deflection".

The terms call forwarding and call diversion are both used to refer to any feature that allows a call to be routed to a third party, and the terms are generally interchangeable.

== Keypad codes ==
=== North America ===
Special types of call forwarding can be activated only if the line is busy, or if there is no answer, or even only for calls from selected numbers. In North America, the North American Numbering Plan (NANP) generally uses the following vertical service codes to control call forwarding:

Forward service	Activation	Deactivation	Number change
All calls	*72; *72[1+e number] (some larger cities)	*73	
On busy or no answer	*68	*81	
From select callers	*63	*81	
On ISDN			*56
Customer-programmable features (where available):
Busy line	*90	*91	*41
No answer	*92	*93	*611

The Sprint Nextel cellphone company uses these:

Forward service	Activation	Deactivation
On busy or no answer	*28[phone number]	*38
On busy	*74[phone number]	*740
On no answer	*73[phone number]	*730
Immediately	*724704732775	*720

- As of January 2012, Sprint charges 20 cents per minute for unconditional call forwarding; conditional call forwarding is included, however.
- Some carriers (including Verizon Wireless) use *71 for conditional forwarding although this is not standard.
- Sometimes, to deactivate call forwarding, *720 will work on cellphones.

=== Europe ===
Most EU fixed-line carriers use the following codes based on CEPT and ETSI standards developed in the 1970s on both POTS and ISDN lines. (There may be some variation to these, but the unconditional code *21* is very much universally standard on EU telephone lines.) The general syntax for all European service codes always follows the pattern below:

Unconditional forwarding
Forward service	Activate	Cancel & Retain	Reestablish	Status
If busy	*69*[phone number]# or *67*[phone number]#	#69# or #67#	*69# or *67#	*#69# or *#67#
If not answered	*61*[phone number]#	#61#	*61#	*#61#

=== Mobile (cell) phones ===
For GSM/3GSM (UMTS) phones, the GSM standard defines the following forwarding Unstructured Supplementary Service Data. These were developed by ETSI and are based on standard European diversion codes and are similar to those used on most landlines in the EU:

Forward service	Activate	Cancel & Deregister	Cancel & Retain	Status	Reestablish
Unconditional forwarding
All calls	*21*[phone number]#	##21#	#21#	*#21#	*21#
Conditional forwarding
If busy	*67*[phone number]#	##67#	#67#	*#67#	*67#
If not answered (see below for custom delay)	*61*[phone number]#	##61#	#61#	*#61# (incl. time delay)	*61#
If out of reach	*62*[phone number]#	##62#	#62#	*#62#	*62#
All forwards	*002*[phone number]#	##002#	#002#	*#002#	*002#
All conditional forwards	*004*[phone number]#	##004#	#004#	*#004#	*004#

If the prefix to the forwarding command is "**" (instead of the usual "*"), then the phone number in that command is registered in the network. If after that the forwarding is deactivated using a command with a single "#", then later it will be possible to re-activate this forwarding again with a simple "*" command without a phone number in it. The forwarding will be re-activated to the number registered in the network. For example, if one uses the out-of-reach code in a forwarding command:

**62*7035551212#

and after that one deactivates the forwarding:

#62#

then later it will be possible to re-activate the out-of-reach forwarding without specifying a number:

*62#

After the above command, all calls made to the phone, while it is out of reach, will be forwarded to 7035551212. It is possible to activate the feature to a number other than the registered number, while still retaining the registered number for later use. For example, issuing the command:

*62*7185551212#

will result in calls being forwarded to 7185551212 (and not to the registered number 7035551212). However, if later a command is issued:

*62#

then the calls will again be forwarded to the registered number 7035551212 (and not to the number from the previous forwarding command 7185551212).

=== Forwarding delay ===
In GSM networks of some US carriers, and in all mobile networks in Europe, it is possible to set a number of seconds for the phone to ring before forwarding the call. This is specified by inserting "*SC*XX" prior to the final "#" of the forwarding command, where "SC" is a service type code (11 for voice, 25 for data, 13 for fax), and "XX" is the number of seconds in increments of 5 seconds. If "SC" is omitted (just "**XX") then by default all service types will be forwarded. For example, forwarding on no-answer can be set with:

*61*[phone number]**[seconds]#

Forwarding voice calls only can be set with:

*61*[phone number]*11*[seconds]#

In some networks there may be a limit of not more than thirty seconds before forwarding (i.e. “XX” can only be 05, 10, 15, 20, 25, or 30; all greater values, like 45 and 60, will result in the forwarding command being rejected and an error message returned).

== Uses ==
Diverting calls can increase one's availability to callers. The main alternative is an answering machine or voicemail, but some callers do not wish to leave a recorded message, but want to have a two-way conversation.

Some businesses have their calls forwarded to a call center, so that the client can reach an operator instead of an answering machine or voice mail. Before the availability of call forwarding, commercial answering services needed to physically connect to every line for which they provided after-hours response; this required their offices to be located near the local central exchange and be fed by a huge multi-pair trunk in which a separate pair of wires existed for each client subscriber. With call forwarding, there is no physical connection to the client's main telephone service, which is merely call-forwarded to the answering service (usually on a direct inward dial number) at the end of the business day.

Often, a suburb of a large city is a toll call from many suburban exchanges on the opposite side of the same city, even though all of these suburbs are a local call to the city centre. A business located in such a suburb may therefore benefit from obtaining a downtown number as an "extender", to be permanently forwarded to their geographic suburban number.

Where unlimited local calls are flat-rated and long-distance incurs high per-minute charges, the downtown number's wider local calling area represents a commercial advantage. Markham (directly north of Toronto) is long-distance to Mississauga (directly west of Toronto). A Markham business with a forwarded 416 number could receive calls from Toronto's entire local calling area without incurring long-distance tolls (as both legs, Mississauga → Toronto and Toronto → Markham, are each a local call).

Some services offer international call forwarding by allocating for the customer a local virtual phone number which is forwarded to any other international destination. The number was permanently forwarded and had no associated telephone line. As a means to obtain an inbound number from another town or region for business use, remote call forwarding schemes tend to be far less expensive than foreign exchange lines but more costly than using voice over IP to obtain a local number in the chosen city.

Call forwarding can also assist travelers who do not have international cell phone plans and who wish to continue to receive their voicemails through VoIP easily while abroad.

== See also ==
- Follow-me
- Hunting
- Unstructured Supplementary Service Data - list of standard GSM codes for network- and SIM-related functions
