= Direct inward dial =

Telephony service

Direct inward dialing (DID), also called direct dial-in (DDI) in Europe and Oceania, is a telecommunication service offered by telephone companies to subscribers who operate private branch exchange (PBX) systems. The feature provides service for multiple telephone numbers over one or more analog or digital physical circuits to the PBX, and transmits the dialed telephone number to the PBX so that a PBX extension is directly accessible for an outside caller, possibly by-passing an auto-attendant.

== Plain old telephone service ==
For direct inward dialing service, the telephone company provides one or more trunk lines to the customer for connection to the customer's PBX, and allocates a range of telephone numbers to the customer. Calls to such numbers are forwarded to the customer's PBX via the trunks. As calls are presented to the PBX, the dialed telephone number is signaled to the PBX with Dialed Number Identification Service (DNIS) using a prearranged, usually partial format, e.g., the last four digits. The PBX may use this information to route the call directly to a telephone extension within the organization without the need for an operator or attendant. The service provides inbound telephone service for many telephone numbers, often requiring far fewer physical telecommunication circuits to satisfy the demand for concurrent usage than the number of DID directory numbers provided.

Historically, DID service used analog circuits. In these types of DID trunks the customer premises equipment provided signaling battery. The central office equipment detects the level of the line and disables service if the circuit is not operational. This is the reverse arrangement from standard plain old telephone service (POTS) lines for which the central office provides signaling and talk battery. More recently, it was far more common to deliver DID service on Primary Rate Interface (PRI) circuits.

The trunks for DID service are unidirectional, inbound to the customer PBX. However, the service may be combined with direct outward dialing (DOD) allowing PBX extensions direct outbound calling capability with identification of their DID telephone number.

In the United States the feature was developed by AT&T in the 1960s, patterned upon the earlier IKZ service of the Deutsche Bundespost in Germany.

== Use in fax services ==
DID service is also used by fax servers. A telephone line is terminated at a telephone interface (fax modem) of a computer that runs fax server software. A set of digits of the assigned phone number is used to identify the recipient of the fax. This allows many recipients to have individual fax numbers while sharing only a few receiving interfaces (fax modems).

Some voice over IP (VoIP) vendors have used one central, remotely located fax server as a means of offering Internet fax service to their clients. In theory, standards such as T.38 should have allowed VoIP subscribers to keep their existing fax equipment working locally; in practice, T.38 at the subscriber's site offers no benefit if the upstream provider is least-cost routing to gateways that do not support T.38 and cannot reliably send or receive fax/modem traffic. A fax server at a central location, connected directly to public switched telephone network (PSTN) T- or E-carrier primary rate interface lines and using direct inward dial to identify the intended addressees can convert incoming faxes to electronic documents (such as TIFF or PDF) for web or e-mail delivery. The fax traffic never passes through the VoIP infrastructure as a dial-up modem call and therefore arrives reliably even if T.38 is not properly supported at some points in the network.

== Voice over IP ==
DID service has similar relevance for voice-over-Internet-Protocol (VoIP) communications. To allow public switched telephone network (PSTN) users to directly reach users with VoIP phones, DID numbers are assigned to a communications gateway. The gateway connects the PSTN to the VoIP network, routing and translating calls between the two networks.

== Sellers ==
In countries with multiple competing local providers, DID services can be purchased in bulk from a competitive local exchange carrier (CLEC).

For voice-over-IP resellers, some specialized CLECs (for local numbers) or interexchange carriers (for toll-free numbers) will deliver blocks of direct inward dial calls already converted to Session Initiation Protocol (SIP) or common VoIP formats. The individual VoIP provider need only obtain an inventory of local or freephone numbers from VoIP-aware carriers in various regions, import them in bulk to an IP PBX and issue them individually to end users. International DID numbers can be purchased in bulk from international providers.

UK geographic DID numbers can often be obtained for free and can be terminated over SIP. A few US DIDs are available without monthly charges from vendors like IPKall (discontinued in 2016), but at the expense of the caller paying for a call to some expensive, rural location.

The majority of vendors charge a nominal amount per number per month (as little as $1/month in small quantities) and then bill per-minute or per number of channels which can be simultaneously in use. For the caller, these numbers can be assigned to locations which are a local call.

== Direct outward dialing ==
The outgoing service from a PBX to a central office exchange, corresponding to DID, is direct outward dialing (DOD) or direct dial central office (DDCO). This service is often combined with DID service and allows direct dialing of global telephone numbers by every extension covered by the service without the assistance of an operator. The calling line identification (CLI) or caller-ID of an extension for outgoing calls is often set to the extension DID number but may be the organization's central switchboard number.

== See also ==
- Dialed Number Identification Service
- Dial plan
