= Vertical service code =

Telephone dialing code for access to service features

A vertical service code (VSC) is a sequence of digits and the signals star (*) and pound/hash (#) dialed on a telephone keypad or rotary dial to access certain telephone service features. Some vertical service codes require dialing of a telephone number after the code sequence. On a touch tone telephone, the codes are usually initiated with the star key, resulting in the commonly used name star codes. On rotary dial telephones, the star is replaced by dialing 11.

In North American telephony, VSCs were developed by the American Telephone and Telegraph Company (AT&T) as Custom Local Area Signaling Services (CLASS or LASS) codes in the 1960s and 70s. Their use became ubiquitous throughout the 1990s and eventually became a recognized standard. As CLASS was an AT&T trademark, the term vertical service code was adopted by the North American Numbering Plan Administration. The use of vertical is a somewhat dated reference to older switching methods and the fact that these services can only be accessed by a telephone subscriber, going up (vertically) inside the local central office instead of out (horizontally) to another telephone company.

== Feature definitions ==
The following are the vertical service codes generally recommended by the North American Numbering Plan Administrator for use in the NANP territories. Not all of these services are available in all areas, and some are only available on landline telephones or Mobile phones.

Local Area Signalling Services (LASS) and Custom Calling Feature Control Codes:

Vertical service code		Service definition	Australia	Japan	UK
Tone dialing	Pulse dialing	Service definition	Australia	Japan	UK
*51	1151	Who called me. Provides the directory number, date and time of unanswered calls.			
*52	1152	Call Hold (Single Line Variety Package). Permits the call to be picked up at another station.			
*53	1153	Distinctive Ring B. Allows a subscriber to alert a specific party distinctively.			
*54	1154	Distinctive Ring C. Allows a subscriber to alert a specific party distinctively.			
*57	1157	Call trace (Malicious caller identification)			
*60	1160	Call blocking			
*61	1161	Priority call			
*62	1162	Selective call waiting			
*63	1163	Selective call forwarding			
*65	1165	Calling number delivery activation			
*66	1166	Continuous redial			
*67	1167	Calling number delivery blocking	1831 #31#		141 #31#
*68	1168	Activate call forwarding on busy			
*69	1169	Last-call return (incoming)	*69 HFC; *10#	1361; 1363	1471
*70	1170	Call waiting disable			
*71	1171	Usage sensitive three-way call			
*72	1172	Unconditional forward: All calls			
*73	1173	Call forward: Cancel			
*74	1174	Speed calling (8 numbers)			
*75	1175	Speed calling (30 numbers)			
*77	1177	Anonymous call rejection activation			
*78	1178	Do not disturb			
*79	1179	Do not disturb disable			
*80	1180	Call blocking disable			
*81	1181	Priority call disable			
*82	1182	Caller ID (per call)	*31#/1832		1470
*83	1183	Selective call forwarding disable			
*85	1185	Caller ID disable			
*86	1186	Continuous redial cancel			
*87	1187	Anonymous call rejection deactivation			
*88	1188	Deactivate call forwarding on busy			
*89	1189	Last-call return cancel			
*90	1190	Conditional forward: Busy line			
*92	1192	Conditional forward: No answer			
*94	1194	Directed call pickup			
*272		Wireless Priority Service			

== See also ==
- Mobile dial code – Short phone numbers offered by some carriers
- Pat Fleet – Prompt voice for most U.S. AT&T implementations of VSC features
- Public switched telephone network – Aggregate of all public telephone networks
- Short code – Short telephone numbers for voice, text and MMS services from mobile phones
- Unstructured Supplementary Service Data
