= Extension (telephone) =

Term in telephony

In residential telephony, an extension telephone is an additional telephone wired to the same telephone line as another. In middle 20th century telephone jargon, the first telephone on a line was a "Main Station" and subsequent ones "Extensions" or even called as intercom. Such extension phones allow making or receiving calls in different rooms, for example in a home, but any incoming call would ring all extensions and any one extension being in use would cause the line to be busy for all users. Some telephones intended for use as extensions have built-in intercom features; a key telephone system for a small business may offer two to five lines, lamps indicating lines already in use, the ability to place calls on 'hold' and an intercom on each of the multiple extensions.

In business telephony, a telephone extension may refer to a phone on an internal telephone line attached to a private branch exchange (PBX) or Centrex system. The PBX operates much as a community switchboard does for a geographic telephone numbering plan and allows multiple lines inside the office to connect without each phone requiring a separate outside line. In these systems, one usually has to dial a number (typically 9 in North America, 0 in Europe) to tell the PBX to connect with an outside landline (also called DDCO, or Direct Dial Central Office) to dial an external number. Within the PBX, the user merely dials the extension number to reach any other user directly. For inbound calls, a switchboard operator or automated attendant may request the number of the desired extension or the call may be completed with direct inbound dialing, if outside numbers are assigned to individual extensions.

An off-premises extension, where a worker at a remote location employs a telephone configured to appear as if it were an extension located at the main business site, may be created in analog telephony by using a leased line to connect the extension to the main enterprise system. Voice over IP makes the creation of off-premises extensions inexpensive and trivial, as broadband Internet and virtual private networking can extend local network access anywhere in the world. In either system, an off-premises extension is reachable from within the same enterprise simply by calling its extension number directly; for inbound and outgoing calls, it functions as if it were located at the main place of business.

== Reasons to use extensions ==
Since not all users dial out at the same time, sharing trunk lines is cheaper than giving each phone its own private landline. Extension to extension calls can be made and kept within the company for cost or security reasons. Extensions make it easier for workers to bring their telephone number with them if they change offices in the building. Extensions allow personalized traffic and call accounting data to be captured by the PBX or a phone recorder for cost control. A hotel or motel, for example, could install PBX extensions in each individual room and use the private branch exchange's call accounting to generate individualised long-distance bills for each room that are presented to the guest upon check-out.
