= Registered fax =

The technical process called as a whole hereinafter "registered fax" (« fax recommandé » in French) consists in sending an electronic document by fax where both the content is certified and the delivery to the recipient is guaranteed.
It serves the purpose of creating legal evidence that unalterable information has been shared between the sender and the receiver of the registered fax.

== The functional principle ==
The functional principle is as follows:

- After the document to be sent is converted into a multiple page image in fax format, this image is time stamped.
- A final page is added to the document to be sent and the resulting multipage image is encapsulated in an electronic envelope file format that allows time stamp insertion as meta data or as a specific tag.
- This envelope document is digitally signed using non reversible cryptography elements and the signature is then printed on the last page of the document for facsimile transmission.
- The receipt of the fax acknowledgment and subsequent transmission report validates that the content has been delivered in full to the receiver, including the page containing the signature and informing the receiver about the certified nature of the facsimile transmission.
- The data (signed document and signature) are available to both parties, sender and receiver, in a confidentially secured environment. The data is securely archived so that it can serve as legal evidence in case of dispute between the parties.

== The access to registered faxes ==
Registered faxes are stored in a secured web environment. The sender and the receiver can check the authenticity of the registered fax at any time in a secured web interface, as the fax is stored and archived for a long period of time.

The following table defines the items to which each party in the registered fax process has access:

	Sender	Receiver	Service Provider
Signed PDF	x	x	
Signature	x	x	
Fax with printed appendix		x	
Transmission report	x		
Read notification	x		
Long term archive	x		x

== Advantages ==
Vladimir Popesco says that, although the traditional faxing is considered a reliable and secure communication mean, the registered fax process introduces some advantages in the fax security domain:

- It guarantees the document delivery and its authenticity, providing a unique digital signature to the fax document.
- Fax transmission is performed via highly secured HTTPS websites
- The data is securely archived and stored on secure servers
- The data is available anytime for both parties, in a secured web environment

== See also ==
Fax
Internet fax
Digital signature
Fax server
Voice over IP
