= ECM =

ECM may refer to the following:

== Economics and commerce ==
- Engineering change management
- Equity capital markets
- Error correction model, an econometric model
- European Common Market

== Mathematics ==
- Lenstra's Elliptic curve method for factoring integers
- European Congress of Mathematics
- Equivalent circuit model for Li-ion cells

== Science and medicine ==
- Ectomycorrhiza
- Electron cloud model
- Engineered Cellular Magmatics
- Erythema chronicum migrans
- Extracellular matrix

== Sport ==
- European Championships Management

== Technology ==
- Electrochemical machining
- Electronic contract manufacturing
- Electronic countermeasure
- Electronics contract manufacturing
- Electronically commutated motor
- Energy conservation measure
- Engine control module
- Enterprise content management
- Error correction mode

== Other uses ==
- East Camberwell railway station, Melbourne
- ECM Records, a record label
- ECM Real Estate Investments, a defunct real estate developer based in Luxembourg
- Edinburgh City Mission, a Christian organization in Scotland
- Editio Critica Maior, a critical edition of the Greek New Testament
- Elektrani na Severna Makedonija (Електрани на Северна Македонија), a power company in North Macedonia
- Energy Corrected Milk, in farming
- Episcopal Conference of Malawi
- Every Child Matters, a UK Government initiative for children
- Every Child Ministries, a Christian charity for African children
- Exceptional case-marking, in linguistics
