= Efax =

efax may refer to:

- Internet fax, the transferral of fax information using the Internet
- efax (software), a computer based fax program for Unix-like computer systems
- Everett Efax file format, a file format
