= T.37 =

ITU-T recommendation

T.37 is an ITU standard which deals with sending fax messages using email. It is also referred to as "Internet fax" or "Store-forward-fax".

A fax machine supporting T.37 will send a fax to an email address by converting the document to a TIFF-F image, attaching it to an email (using the MIME format), and sending the document (using SMTP). The destination fax receives the email and prints the attached document.

To interface with regular fax machines:

- T.37 can be used in conjunction with fax gateways to communicate with regular fax machines. The fax gateway converts emails to regular faxes or regular faxes to emails.
- A T.37-compliant fax machine includes legacy fax functionality to send to regular fax numbers and requires a phone line for this.
- To find the destination faxes email address, the RFC 4143 standard is in development, which allows a fax machine to use a destination fax number to look up an alternative email address.

== See also ==
- Unified messaging
- T.38 (Fax over the Internet Protocol)
- Internet fax
