= Efax (software) =

efax
- Stable release: 1.0.1b / 6 April 2002
- Operating system: Unix-like
- Type: Integrated fax program
- License: GPL
- Website: http://www.cce.com/efax

efax is an integrated fax program for Unix-like computer systems, produced by Casas Communications Engineering since 1993.

The software allows users to send and receive faxes using a computer, fax modem, and telephone line. It is command-line based, but there are several graphical user interfaces available.

efax is open-source and free software, licensed under the GPL. It is included in several major Linux distributions, including Debian, Red Hat, Mandriva, and others. There is also a BSD version, and it forms part of the Apple Mac OS X Darwin system.
