= 3D Fax =

3D Fax is a computer program, developed for Microsoft Windows by InfoImaging Technologies in the mid-1990s, for file transfer via fax. The program encodes a file into an image, which the user would then print and send via a fax machine or transmit directly from the computer using a fax modem. The recipient would then scan the transmitted image or receive it via a fax modem, and use 3D Fax to decode it back to its original binary form.

InfoImaging claimed a capacity of 40kB per sheet of paper using its image encoding of files, extended to 110kB (between two fax modems) in the 2.0 version. InfoWorld's reviewer found that the 1.0 version could compress both a 90kB Word document and a 302kB image file to less than 40kB, so the files could each be faxed as a single page.
