= Famicom Detective Club =

Adventure game duology

- Top: The Missing Heir Vol. 1 and Vol. 2; Bottom: The Girl Who Stands Behind Vol. 1 and Vol. 2
- Developer: Nintendo R&D1 (Note: Tose went uncredited but shares copyright for The Missing Heir. The 2021 Switch remakes and Emio - The Smiling Man were developed by Mages.)
- Publisher: Nintendo
- Director: Satoru Okada
- Producer: Gunpei Yokoi
- Designer: Yoshio Sakamoto
- Artist: Tetsuji Tanaka
- Writers: Yoshio Sakamoto; Toru Osawa; Nagihiro Asama
- Composer: Kenji Yamamoto (Note: Yamamoto only composed music for The Girl Who Stands Behind. Composition in The Missing Heir is credited to "Hiromi" (presumed pseudonymous).) Takeshi Abo (Remake)
- Platforms: Family Computer Disk System; Super Famicom; Game Boy Advance; Nintendo Switch
- Release: 1988–1989: Family Computer Disk System; The Missing Heir; JP: April 27, 1988 ^{(Vol. 1)}; JP: June 14, 1988 ^{(Vol. 2)}; The Girl Who Stands Behind; JP: May 23, 1989 ^{(Vol. 1)}; JP: June 30, 1989 ^{(Vol. 2)}; Super Famicom; The Girl Who Stands Behind (Remake); JP: April 1, 1998; Game Boy Advance; JP: August 10, 2004; Nintendo Switch (Remake); WW: May 14, 2021
- Genre: Adventure
- Mode: Single-player

Famicom Detective Club (Note: Japanese: ファミコン探偵倶楽部, Hepburn: Famikon Tantei Kurabu) is an adventure game duology developed and published by Nintendo for the Family Computer Disk System. The first entry, The Missing Heir, (Note: Japanese: 消えた後継者, Hepburn: Kieta Kōkeisha) was released in 1988, followed by a prequel released the next year titled The Girl Who Stands Behind. (Note: Japanese: うしろに立つ少女, Hepburn: Ushiro ni Tatsu Shōjo; also known as Famicom Tantei Club Part II) In both games, the player takes on the role of a young man solving murder mysteries in the Japanese countryside.

The duology was the first writing project for Yoshio Sakamoto, before he found greater success and recognition with Metroid. The games were inspired by Enix's 1983 adventure game The Portopia Serial Murder Case, horror films by Italian director Dario Argento, and detective novels by Japanese writer Seishi Yokomizo. Both games were only released in Japan and received positive reception from critics.

Nintendo remade The Girl Who Stands Behind for the Super Famicom in 1998, and updated remakes of both games were released for the Nintendo Switch in 2021, developed by Mages. The Switch remakes were localized and released outside Japan, a first for the games. Related media includes an episodic Satellaview broadcast from 1997 titled BS Tantei Club: Yuki ni Kieta Kako, and a new adventure titled Emio – The Smiling Man, (Note: Japanese: 笑み男, Hepburn: Emio; lit. 'Smile Man') released in 2024.

== Gameplay ==
The player speaks with Ayumi Tachibana in The Missing Heir (Disk System version).

In Famicom Detective Club, the player chooses commands from a menu such as Ask, Examine, Take, Show, and Go to interact with the environment and characters. Character dialogue is displayed in a message box at the bottom of the screen. Commands are only listed in situations when they can be used. Some commands like Examine or Take place a cursor over the scene which the player can direct to an item or area to interact with. At certain points in the story, the player is asked to answer questions, and must scroll through letters to write out an answer. The player may save their progress to return to the game later when the option is listed in the command menu.

== Plot ==
=== The Missing Heir ===
The story begins with a man, Amachi, discovering the fallen protagonist on the ground near a cliff. The protagonist discovers that he has lost his memory, and after recuperating, he revisits the cliff and meets a young girl named Ayumi Tachibana. He learns from Ayumi that he is an assistant detective investigating the death of Kiku Ayashiro, and heads over to the nearby Ayashiro estate located in Myoujin village. The Ayashiro family owns a huge plot of land passed down from generation to generation, but there is a strange saying in the village that the dead will return to life to kill anyone who attempts to steal the treasure of the Ayashiro family. As the protagonist investigates the mysterious death of Kiku Ayashiro, he discovers the terrifying connection between this saying and the serial killings which take place.

=== The Girl Who Stands Behind ===
Three years before the events of The Missing Heir, the protagonist, a 15-year-old boy, escapes his orphanage to look for his parents. Two police officers chase after the protagonist until Shunsuke Utsugi, a private detective respected by the police, takes him in as an assistant.

A few months later, Utsugi and the protagonist are called to investigate the murder of freshman schoolgirl Yoko Kojima. The protagonist begins gathering information from Ushimitsu High School to solve the Yoko case and connect it with the Genjiro Kaneda case along with the help of Yoko's two high school friends; a girl named Ayumi Tachibana and a boy named Hitomi Kawai. It soon emerges that Yoko was deep into an investigation of "The Tale of the Girl Who Stands Behind," a rumor involving a ghost of a blood-soaked girl that stands behind a student, and the trio set out to discover the truth behind this rumor.

== Development ==
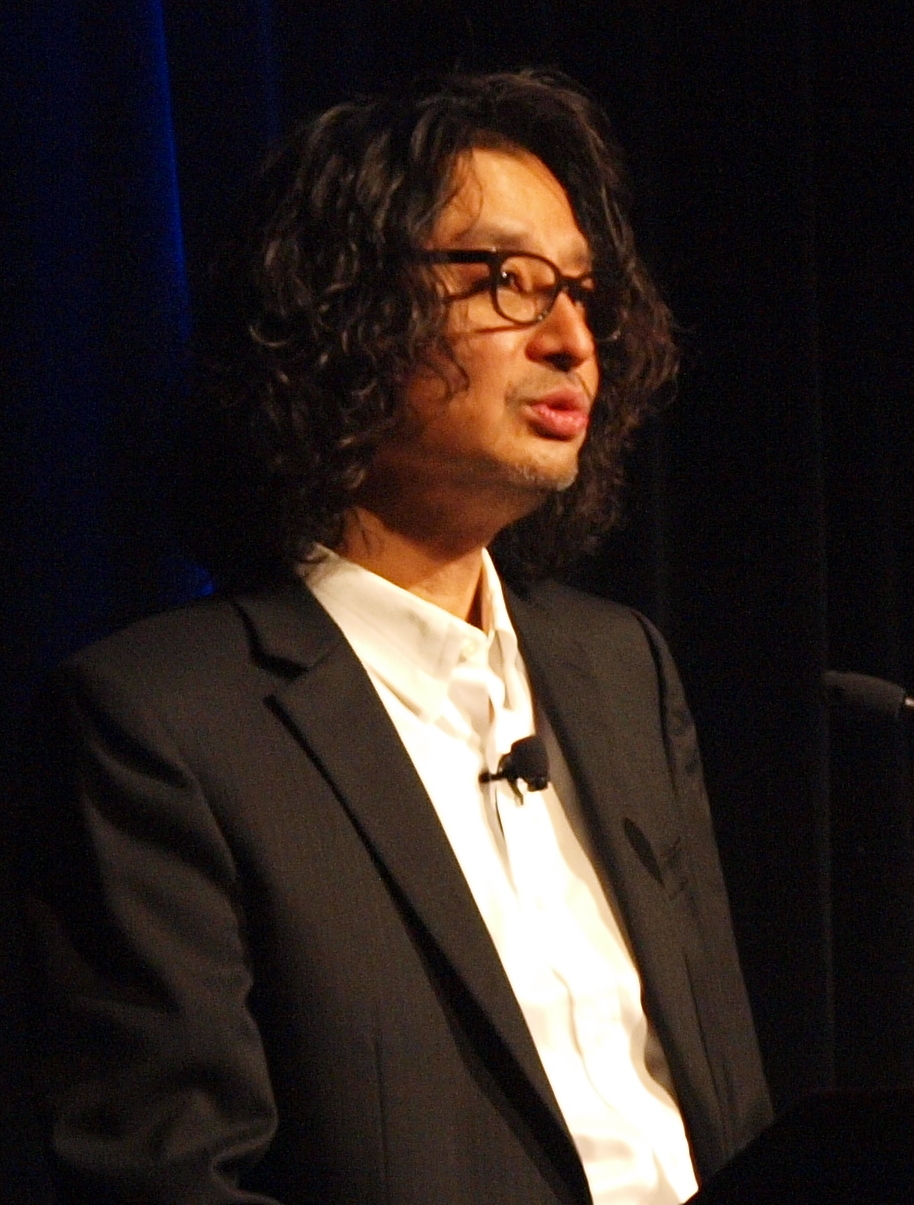
Writer Yoshio Sakamoto in 2010

The duology was written by Yoshio Sakamoto. The games were his first experience with scenario writing, and he considers it a turning point in his career. Sakamoto would later become more well known for his work on the Metroid series.

Development of the games began when Gunpei Yokoi asked Sakamoto to develop a game titled Famicom Shōnen Tanteidan (Famicom Youth Detective Group) with another company. The game would ultimately become Famicom Detective Club. Only being given the title as a foundation, Sakamoto pulled inspiration from The Portopia Serial Murder Case (1983) to create a text-based adventure game with a tight story. Early in development, Sakamoto briefly worked on the dating sim Nakayama Miho no Tokimeki High School (1987), which had a troubled development due to the involvement of Miho Nakayama and using the Disk Fax network. Sakamoto made sure to avoid those frustrations when developing Famicom Detective Club.

Before development began in earnest, Sakamoto handwrote the scenario in book form and shared it with the staff. The scenario was originally titled Corpse Village (屍の村, Shikabane no Mura), but Sakamoto was convinced to change it after showing the proposal to his boss. Sakamoto explained in a retrospective interview that for games with deep stories like adventure games, it is usually best to start development with the story as the root. He considers the games an homage to Italian horror filmmaker Dario Argento. Reflecting on his early days at Nintendo, Sakamoto said he "wanted to create things in the same manner as Argento did." The Girl Who Stands Behind was inspired by Argento's method of connecting music and images in Deep Red (1975), Sakamoto's favorite movie. Additionally, The Missing Heir took some inspiration from Seishi Yokomizo's novels such as Inugamike no Ichizoku and Akuma no Temari Uta, and the style of The Girl Who Stands Behind was inspired by shōjo manga.

Writer Toru Osawa intended the packaging artwork for The Missing Heir to be similar to the posters of Toho's Seishi Yokomizo films. However, Osawa and Sakamoto were dissatisfied with the final art, which was commissioned from a company outside Nintendo. As a result, for The Girl Who Stands Behind, Osawa personally created a sketch and layout based on shōjo manga for the packaging artwork, which was completed by a professional artist.

Composer Kenji Yamamoto recalled that he had aimed to use the Famicom's sound system to its fullest extent in The Girl Who Stands Behind, and that Sakamoto had instructed him to make the final scene as scary as possible. To accomplish this, Yamamoto set the volume of the regular music to be about half of what normal games used, and then increased the volume to its maximum level for the final scene, so as to startle players.

== Release ==
Famicom Detective Club was originally released for the Family Computer Disk System across four disks. The Missing Heir was released across two disks on April 27 and June 14, 1988. The Girl Who Stands Behind was also released across two disks on May 23 and June 30, 1989.

=== Re-releases ===
The Girl Who Stands Behind was remade for the Super Famicom and released through the Nintendo Power flash cartridge service in April 1998. The remake features new graphics and sound, and adds a memo feature allowing players to review information on characters in the story. In November 2000, Nintendo Online Magazine reported that The Girl Who Stands Behind was the seventh most popular Super Famicom game out of 163 available for the Nintendo Power service. Fans released a translation patch for this version in 2004.

The original Disk System duology was re-released for the Game Boy Advance in August 2004 in emulated form. They were released as two separate game carts among ten total in the third wave of Famicom Mini series releases. Both games were among five from that group to reach Japan's top ten in sales for the week of release. The murder and smoking scenes in The Girl Who Stands Behind resulted in a CERO 15 (CERO C) content rating, making it the first Nintendo title to receive that rating after CERO's founding two years prior.

The Missing Heir has been re-released on the Wii Virtual Console, the Wii U eShop, and the Nintendo 3DS eShop. The Disk System version of The Girl Who Stands Behind was released on the Wii and 3DS, but not the Wii U. The Super Famicom remake was released on all three platforms.

=== 2021 remake ===
Both Famicom Detective Club games were remade for the Nintendo Switch. The remakes were developed by Mages with supervision from Nintendo staff who developed the originals. The games feature new graphics, music, and the addition of voiced dialogue. Originally planned for a 2020 release, they were delayed to 2021. The remakes were released on May 14, 2021; English localizations were released on the same date worldwide, marking their first release outside Japan. The games were sold individually and as a bundle at a reduced price. A collector's edition was released in Japan, featuring a cartridge with both games, an artbook, soundtrack CDs, and other collectibles.

The Switch remakes feature voice acting, unlike the originals. All voice tracks are in Japanese, with subtitles available in English. The protagonist is voiced by Megumi Ogata, and Yuko Minaguchi reprises her role as Ayumi Tachibana after voicing her in BS Tantei Club: Yuki ni Kieta Kako on the Satellaview in 1997.

== Reception ==
Disk System reception

Review scores
Publication	Score
Famitsu	29/40 (Part I); 7/10, 7/10, 7/10, 7/10 (Part II)
Yuge	Positive (Part I); Positive (Part II)

Awards
Publication	Award
Famimaga (1991)	Best 5 4th, Music 4th, Hot Hit 3rd (Part II)
Famitsu (2017)	Adventure Game General Election 18th (Part II)

The Famicom Detective Club duology received positive reception from Japanese critics. Public reception was also positive; readers of Famimaga voted in a poll to give The Missing Heir a 19.30 out of 25 score and The Girl Who Stands Behind a 20.90 out of 25 score. Yuge's Ayu Uzuki regarded The Missing Heir as a "masterpiece" of adventure games, praising the Seishi Yokomizo-like world building. Uzuki also noted that the atmosphere in The Girl Who Stands Behind was different to the previous game but commended its familiar school setting for being scary. Reviewing in 2016, Den Faminico Gamer called The Girl Who Stands Behind a pioneer in school ghost stories ahead of works like the novel and film series Gakkō no Kaidan.

Playing a fan translation of the Super Famicom remake, VentureBeat was impressed and highlighted the anime-style graphics, color schemes, and eerie soundtrack.

=== Switch remakes ===
Nintendo Switch reception

Aggregate scores
Aggregator	Score
Metacritic	74/100 (Part I); 74/100 (Part II)
OpenCritic	52% recommend

Review scores
Publication	Score
Destructoid	7.0/10 (Part I); 7.5/10 (Part II)
Famitsu	8/10, 7/10, 8/10, 8/10 (Note: Each of the four reviewers in Famitsu scored the game on a ten point scale)
GameSpot	8/10
GamesRadar+	3.0/5
Hardcore Gamer	3/5
Nintendo Life	8/10
Nintendo World Report	7/10 (Part I); 8/10 (Part II)
Shacknews	8/10
Siliconera	6/10
Video Games Chronicle	3.0/5

The Famicom Detective Club remakes received "mixed or average" reviews on Switch, according to review aggregator site Metacritic. As of June 2021, both games have sold a combined 20,949 physical copies in Japan.

The presentation and updated visuals were highly praised by critics. CJ Andriessen of Destructoid called the games' artwork "outstanding" and "rich with details," while Graham Russell of Siliconera and Chris Scullion of Video Games Chronicle similarly described it as feeling like interactive anime. Hope Bellingham of GamesRadar compared the games' background art and character designs to the 2016 anime film Your Name, and Kate Gray of Nintendo Life wrote that "its modern animation style achieves a lot with a little." TJ Denzer of Shacknews wrote that the games' presentation was "quite faithful and also thoroughly evolutionary" compared to the 1988 originals. The music was also well-received, with critics praising the new soundtrack and the option to listen to the original Famicom and Super Famicom music.

The writing and characters were positively received. Denzer praised the games as "telling good, smart mystery narratives," and Bellingham wrote that they were "compelling" and "kept you guessing from start to finish." Andrew King of GameSpot called the games' cast of characters "memorable" and "striking," and Andriessen specifically called Ayumi Tachibana "an absolute delight of a character." Jenni Lada of Siliconera wrote that the story of The Girl Who Stands Behind was "genuinely dramatic and thrilling," and found its suggestion of supernatural elements to be intriguing.

The gameplay was largely criticized, with numerous reviewers opining that its 1980s-era design had not aged well, and that its trial-and-error nature was frustrating and repetitive. Lada regarded the gameplay as being "an acquired taste," and felt that players would need a great deal of patience to enjoy it. However, critics appreciated the additions of a text log and a notebook to organize case information, which were seen as improvements over the original versions. The gameplay was frequently compared to that of other adventure games, such as the Ace Attorney and Monkey Island series, and critics including Scullion, Gray, and King felt that fans of those titles would also likely enjoy the Famicom Detective Club games.

Reviewers recommended playing the games together, but were divided on which title they preferred. Some considered The Girl Who Stands Behind to be superior to The Missing Heir, with Denzer citing gameplay enhancements and higher-quality visuals, while Andriessen described it as being a more "streamlined" and "action-oriented" experience. Conversely, King felt The Missing Heir had more interactive gameplay elements, and Gray wrote that its artwork "has a lot more beautiful moments" in comparison to The Girl Who Stands Behind.

== Legacy ==
The character Ayumi Tachibana later appeared as a collectible trophy in Super Smash Bros. Melee (2001), and according to Super Smash Bros. series director Masahiro Sakurai, was at one point considered as a fighter for Melee.

=== BS Tantei Club: Yuki ni Kieta Kako ===
The first two games were followed by BS Tantei Club: Yuki ni Kieta Kako, (Note: Japanese: BS探偵倶楽部 雪に消えた過去, Hepburn: Bī Esu Tantei Kurabu Yuki ni Kieta Kako; lit. 'BS Detective Club: The Past That Disappeared in the Snow') an adventure game released by Nintendo in 1997 for the Satellaview, a satellite modem peripheral for the Super Famicom. It was broadcast in three chapters; the first from February 9–15, the second from February 16–22, and the last from February 23–March 1. Famicom Detective Club fans made efforts to preserve game data related to BS Detective Club: Yuki ni Kieta Kako, especially since it has yet to be translated from Japanese. This is due to the difficulty of accessing the audio files that were broadcast through Satellaview with the game. Nintendo rarely acknowledges any games that were only published through Satellaview.

The character Ayumi Tachibana from the first two games stars in Yuki ni Kieta Kako. The player takes the role of Ayumi (voiced by Yūko Minaguchi) investigating a murder to prove the innocence of her mother. Ayumi writes a letter to her friend Reiko, reminiscing about the last time they saw each other when they were visiting their home village, Ojitani. Ayumi was visiting to spend time with her mother, Toshie, who was staying with her own parents while ill to receive treatment and recuperate. During the visit, Toshie discovered the body of the former mayor, Gozo Kusano, in his home and became a suspect in the murder. A long-standing feud between the Tachibana and Kusano families came to light, and Gozo's son, the current mayor, was also murdered, forcing Ayumi to discover the truth behind the feud, a local legend, and another pair of deaths 18 years prior.

=== Emio – The Smiling Man ===
A fourth game in the series, Emio – The Smiling Man, (Note: Japanese: 笑み男, Hepburn: Emio) developed by Mages and Nintendo EPD (with Yoshio Sakamoto returning as writer), released on August 29, 2024.
