= Fax modem =

Type of modem

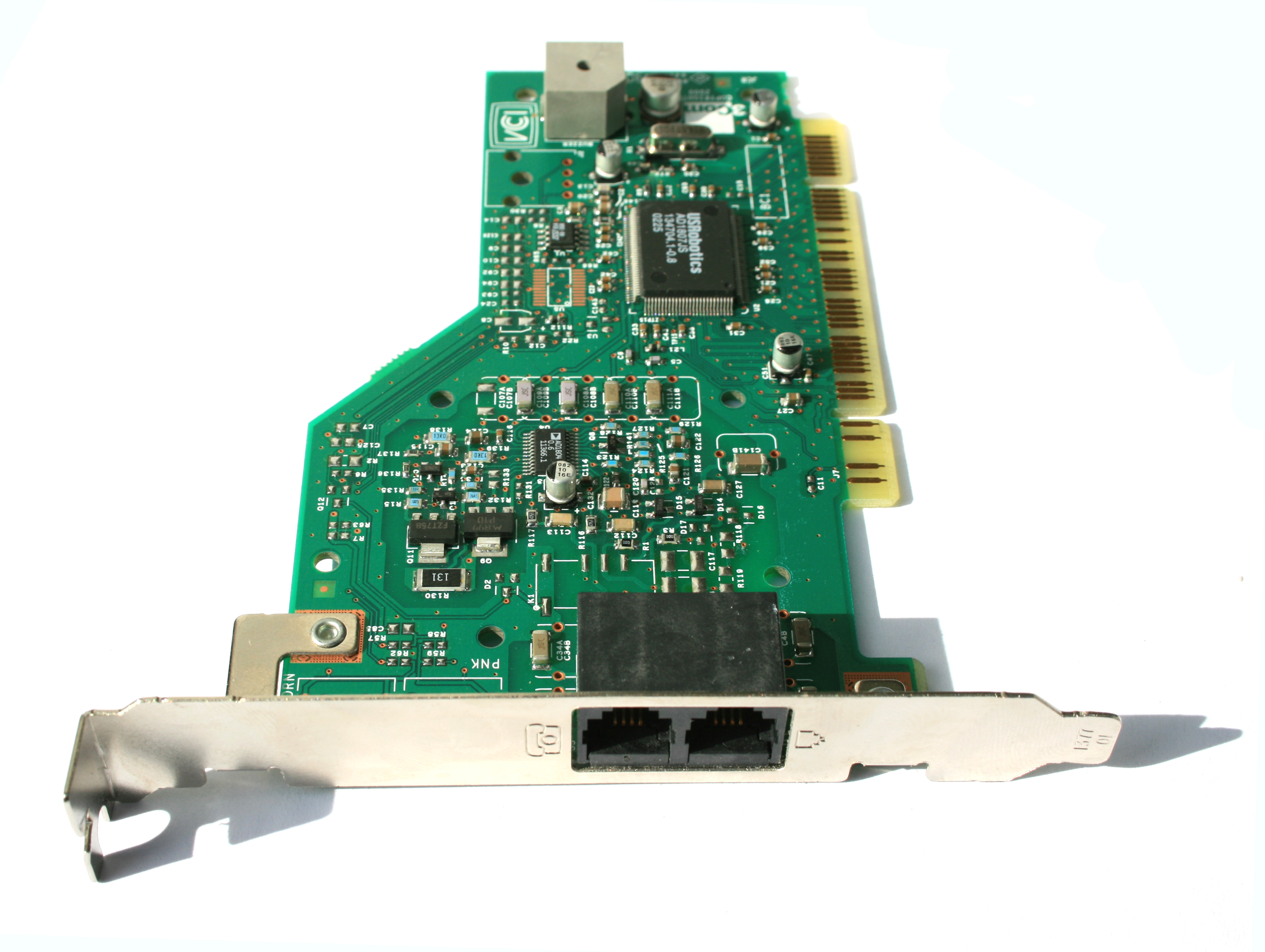
A V.92 fax modem card

A fax modem enables a computer to transmit and receive documents as faxes on a telephone line. A fax modem is similar to a data modem but is designed to transmit and receive documents to and from a fax machine or another fax modem. Some, but not all, fax modems do double duty as data modems. As with other modems, fax modems can be internal or external. Internal fax modems are often called fax boards.

In the early 1990s small business PCs commonly had a PC-based fax/modem card and fax software (typically WinFax Pro). Largely replaced by email, PC-based faxing with a fax/modem declined at the turn of the century. Where faxing from a PC is required there are a number of Internet-based faxing alternatives. Where businesses still had one or more traditional fax machines churning out pages, they were usually outnumbered by PCs processing E-mail.

== PC faxing ==
Computer users may set up a PC fax/modem with card, telephone line access and software. A special printer driver may be included to allow treating a fax modem as a printer. Fax integration is available in unified communications (e.g. E-mail, Voice Mail and Fax managed together), in a number of Hosted PBX products where standard features allow users to send a fax by using the fax phone number as the address of a E-mail message, and receive incoming faxes via E-mail with the Fax content presented as a PDF attachment.

Medical systems continue to use this technology into the 21st century, but many home and business users dropped the use of fax modems in favor of high speed internet.

== Illustrations ==
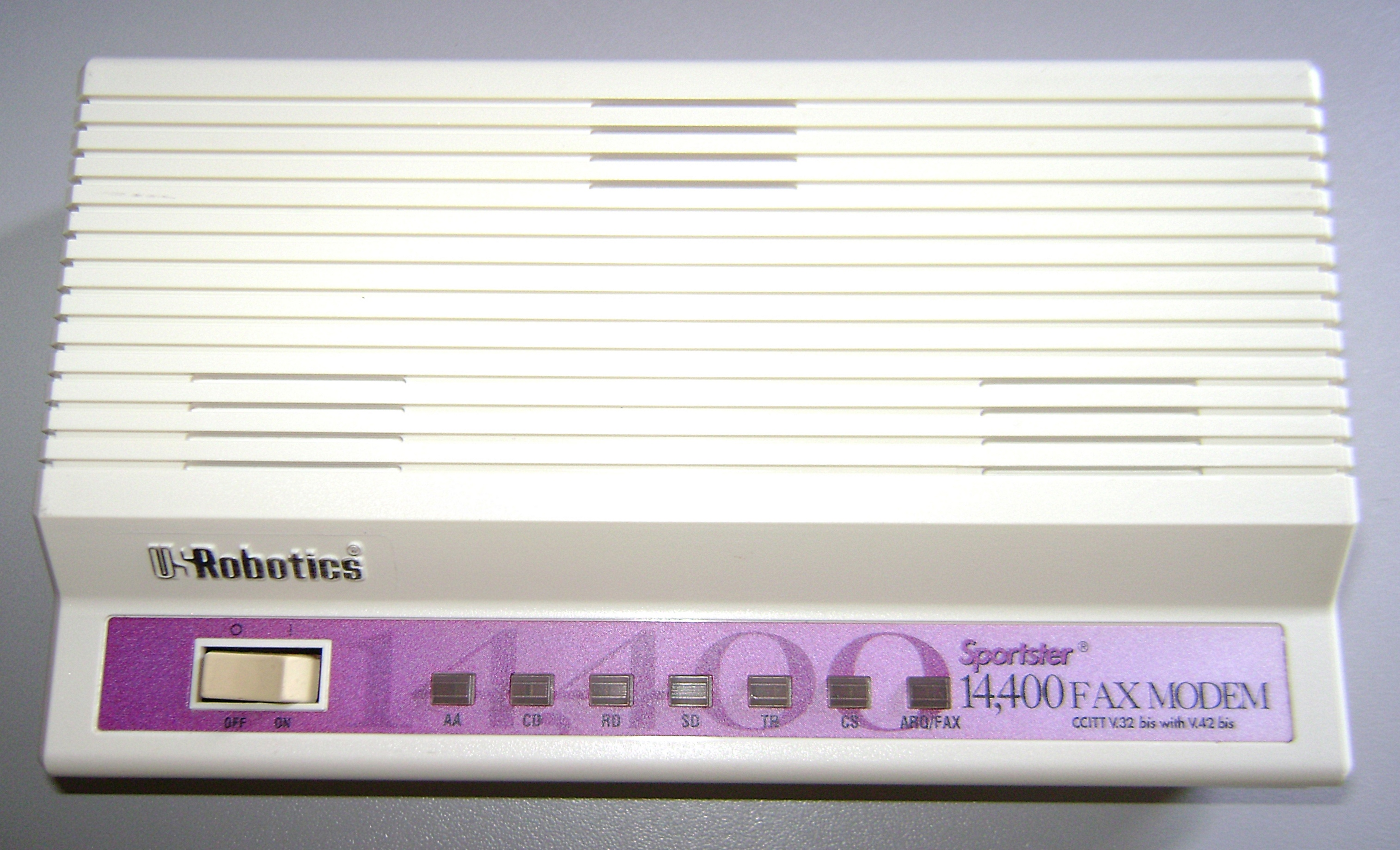
External 14.4K data and fax modem

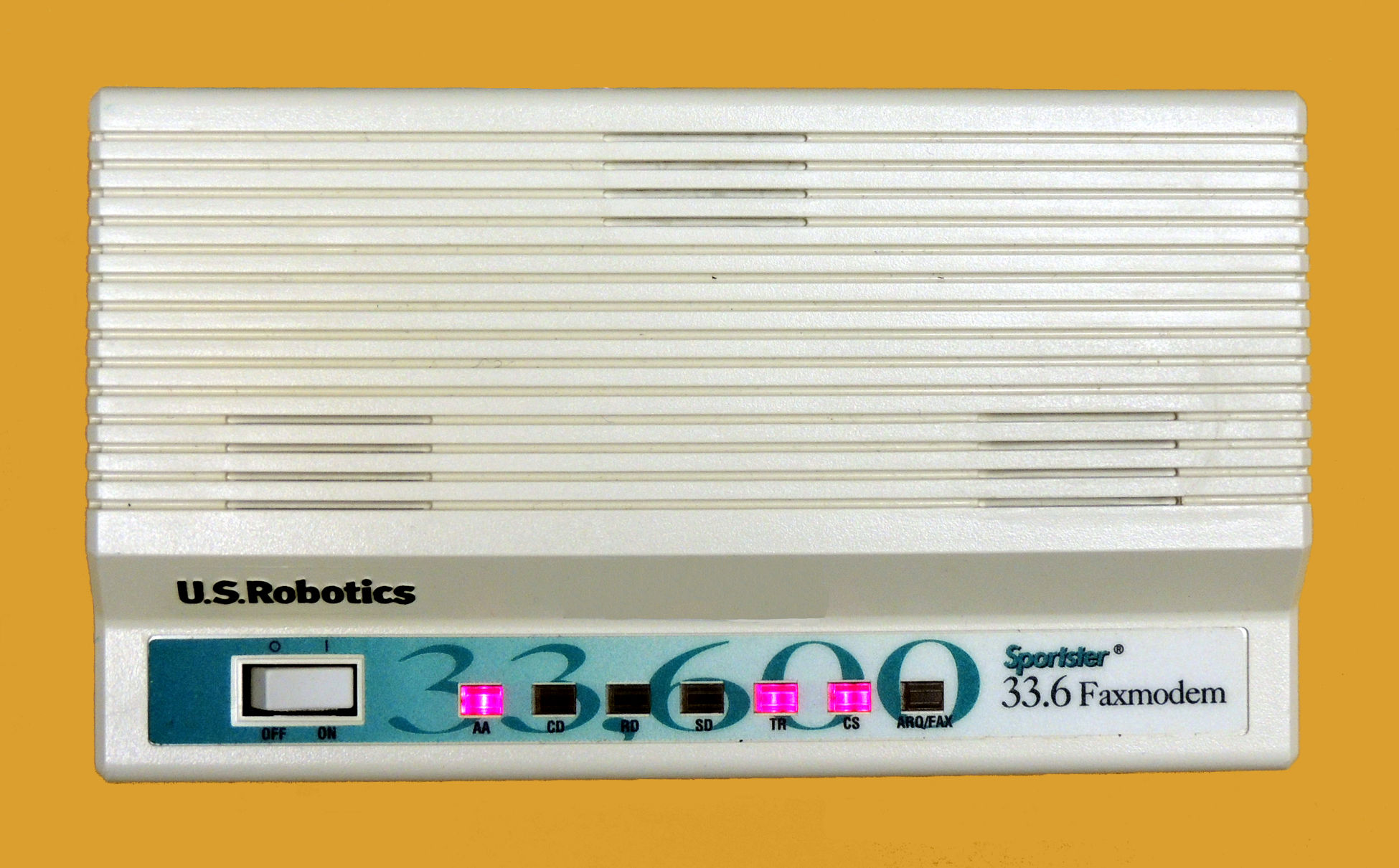
External 33.6K data and fax modem

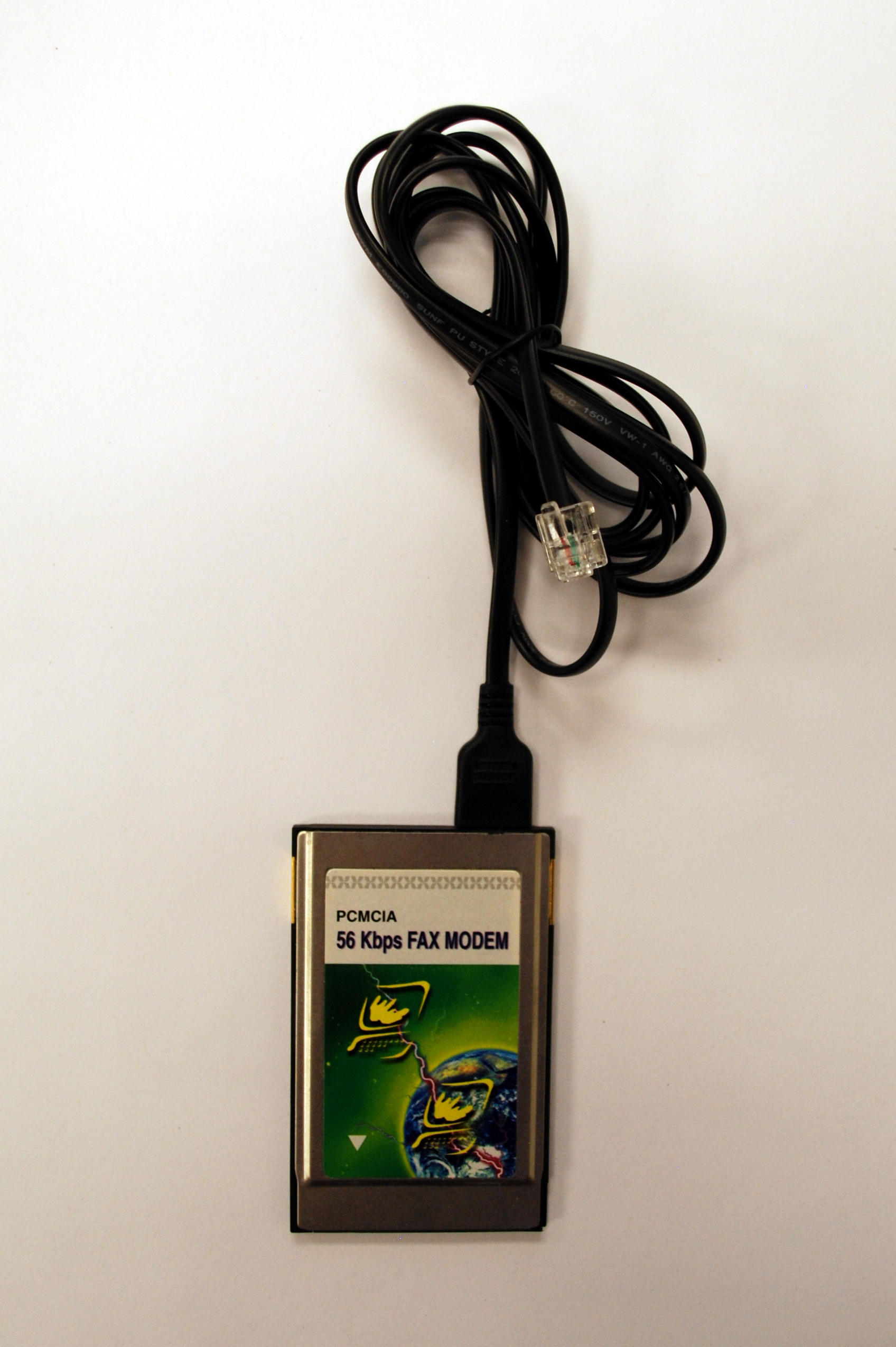
PCMCIA fax modem for portable computing applications

== See also ==
- Fax
- Fax demodulator
- Fax server
- Internet fax
- Modem
- Pulse-code modulation
- Telephony
