= TSID =

TSID may mean:

- transmitting subscriber identification when sending faxes.
- MPEG Transport Stream identifier
