= Esker Fax =

Esker Fax is a Windows server-based fax server solution, that allows fax processing transmission and reception from both desktop clients, and host applications. The software is produced by Madison, Wisconsin-based Esker.

== Product description ==
Desktop users can both send and receive faxes via the Esker Fax server, by using their own email client, via their web browser using the Document Manager web interface or by utilizing the stand-alone Esker Universal Fax Client.

The server is also capable of integration with host applications to automate the faxing of business documents such as purchase orders, reports, and invoices directly from the host application.

Transmission and reception can be based on standard Class 2 / 2.0 modem devices, CAPI devices such as the Eicon Diva Server, Cantata Fax hardware or by utilizing Esker's own devices with the Fax on Demand Connector.

== See also ==
- Fax server
