= Called subscriber identification =

Fax machine identification string

A called subscriber identification (abbreviated CSID) is a string that identifies a specific fax machine as the recipient of a fax.

This string (typically less than 40 characters) is usually a combination of the fax machine's telephone number and identification of the fax machine's user.

== Origins ==
The CSID (and related TSID) are part of the modern landline fax specification. The CSID is often the same as the same machine's transmitting subscriber identification (TSID). A CSID and TSID are usually programmed into a fax machine when the machine is set up.

== How it works ==
When a fax machine receives a fax, it sends its CSID to the transmitting machine. The CSID is displayed on the sending fax machine and is usually recorded in the transmitting machine's log of sent faxes and printed on a report or confirmation of the fax transmission. This helps to confirm that the fax is being sent to the correct recipient.

Computer software sometimes emulates the functions of a fax machine.

A CSID and TSID are programmed into the software when it is configured. The software uses them when it sends or receives faxes.

== See also ==
- Caller ID
- Transmitting Subscriber Identification (TSID)
