= Fax =

Method of transmitting images, often of documents

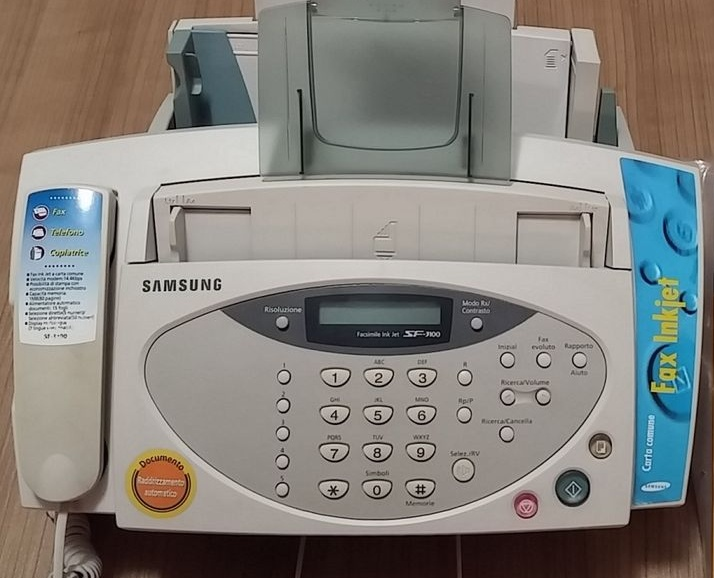
This fax machine from 1999 used relatively new inkjet printing technology on normal paper.

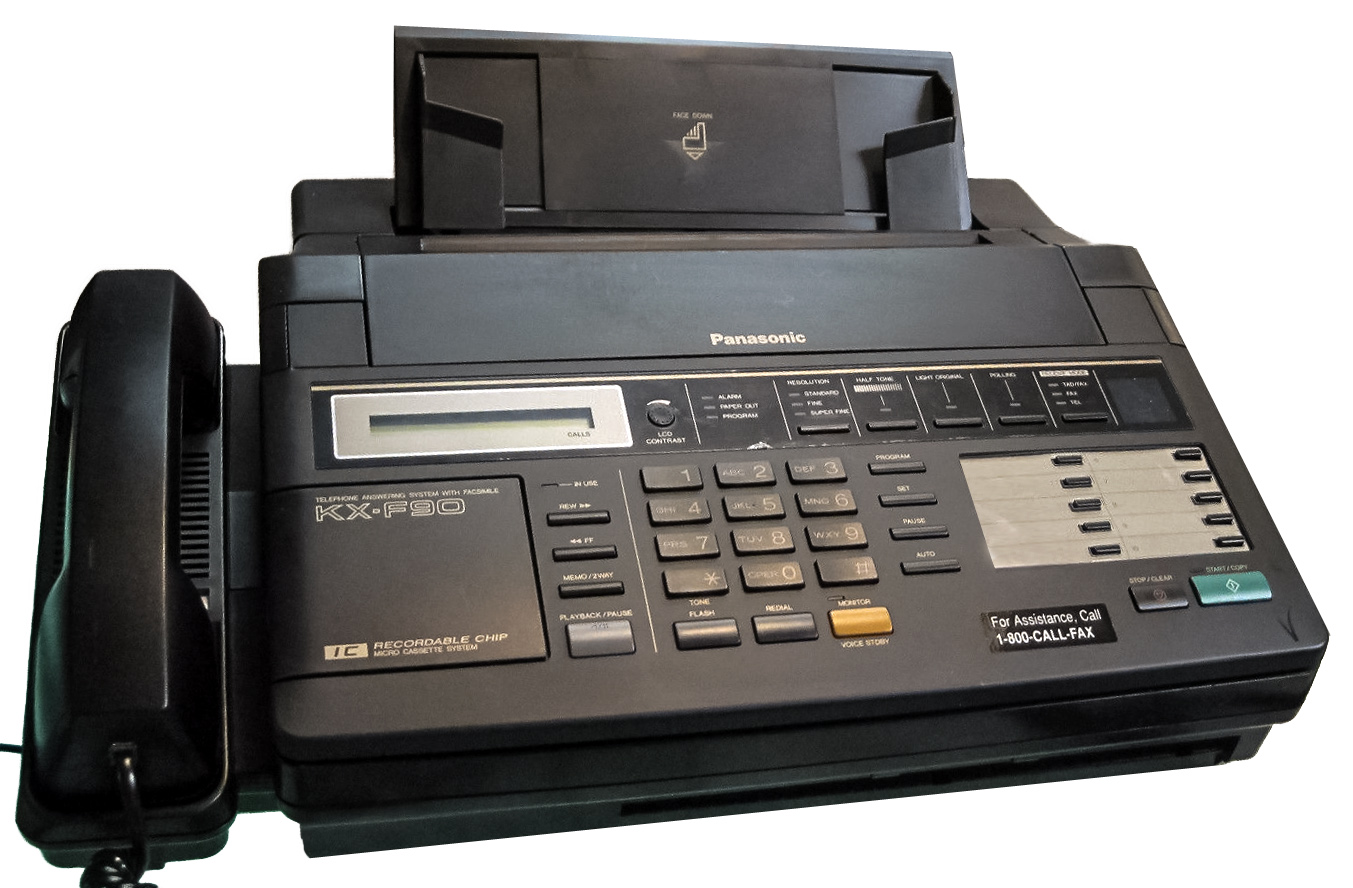
Like many fax machines, this 1990 model used thermal printing on relatively expensive thermal paper which came in rolls. The roll was inserted into a compartment in the machine.

Fax (short for facsimile), sometimes called telecopying or telefax (short for telefacsimile), is the telephonic transmission of scanned printed material (both text and images), normally to a telephone number connected to a printer or other output device. The original document is scanned with a fax machine (or a telecopier), which processes the contents (text or images) as a single fixed graphic image, converting it into a bitmap, and then transmitting it through the telephone system in the form of audio-frequency tones. The receiving fax machine interprets the tones and reconstructs the image, printing a paper copy. Early systems used direct conversions of image darkness to audio tone in a continuous or analog manner. Since the 1980s, most machines transmit an audio-encoded digital representation of the page, using data compression to transmit areas that are all-white or all-black, more quickly.

Initially a niche product, fax machines became ubiquitous in offices in the 1980s and 1990s. However, they have largely been rendered obsolete by Internet-based technologies such as email and the World Wide Web, but are still used in some medical administration and law enforcement settings.

== History ==
=== Wire transmission ===
Scottish inventor Alexander Bain worked on chemical-mechanical fax-type devices and in 1846 Bain was able to reproduce graphic signs in laboratory experiments. He received British patent 9745 on May 27, 1843, for his "Electric Printing Telegraph". Frederick Bakewell made several improvements on Bain's design and demonstrated a telefax machine. The Pantelegraph was invented by the Italian physicist Giovanni Caselli. He introduced the first commercial telefax service between Paris and Lyon in 1865, some 11 years before the invention of the telephone.

In 1880, English inventor Shelford Bidwell constructed the scanning phototelegraph that was the first telefax machine to scan any two-dimensional original, not requiring manual plotting or drawing. An account of Henry Sutton's "telephane" was published in 1896. Around 1900, German physicist Arthur Korn invented the Bildtelegraph, widespread in continental Europe especially following a widely noticed transmission of a wanted-person photograph from Paris to London in 1908, used until the wider distribution of the radiofax. Its main competitors were the Bélinographe by Édouard Belin first, then since the 1930s the Hellschreiber, invented in 1929 by German inventor Rudolf Hell, a pioneer in mechanical image scanning and transmission.

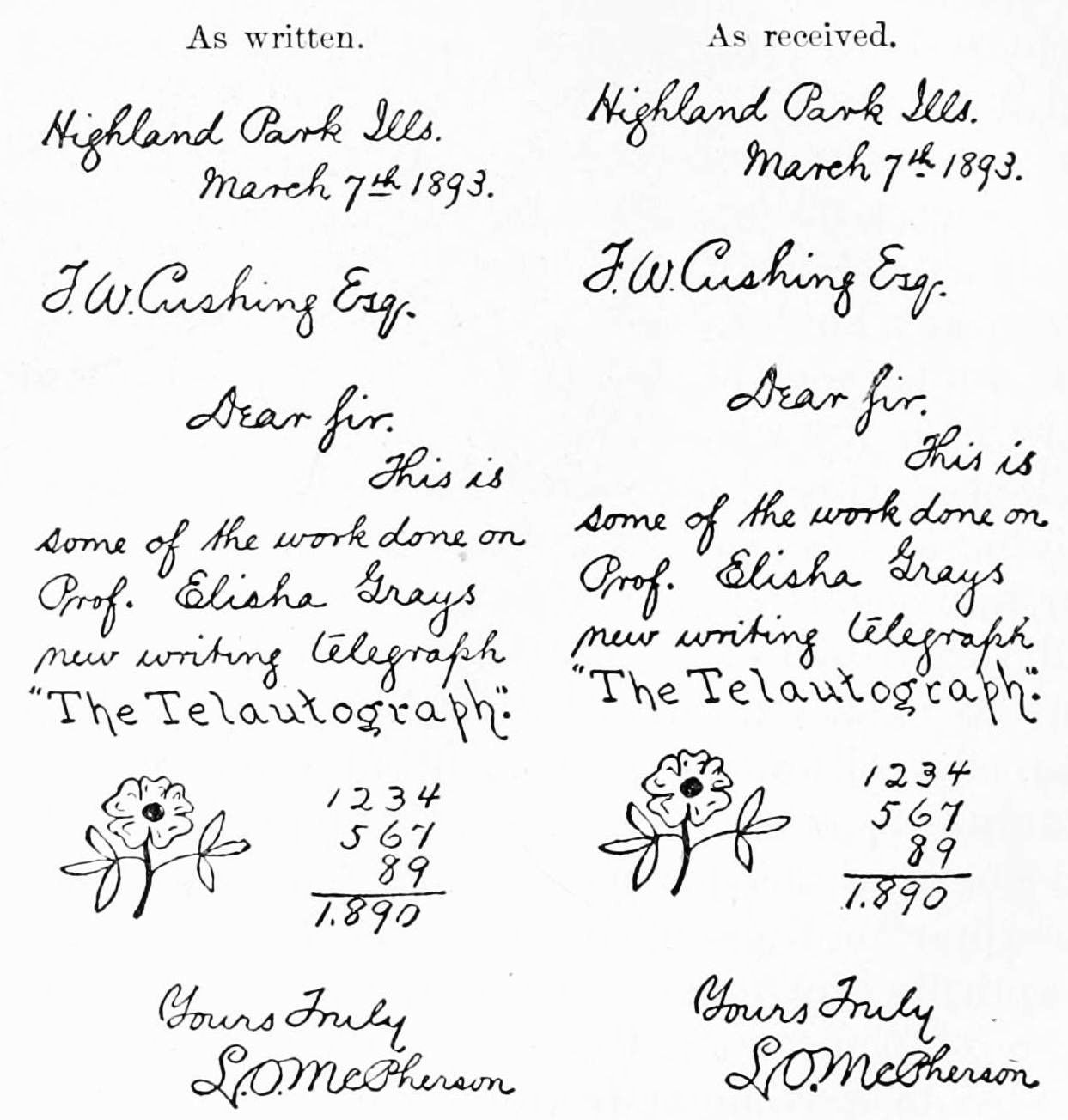
Input (left) and output (right) of a telautograph transmission

The 1888 invention of the telautograph by Elisha Gray marked a further development in fax technology by making it possible for users to send signatures over long distances. This was used for verifying identification or ownership over long distances.

On May 19, 1924, scientists of the AT&T Corporation "by a new process of transmitting pictures by electricity" sent 15 photographs by telephone from Cleveland to New York City, such photos being suitable for newspaper reproduction. Previously, photographs had been sent over the radio using this process.

The Western Union "Deskfax" fax machine, announced in 1948, was a compact machine that fit comfortably on a desktop, using special spark printer paper.

During the 1960s and 1970s, and initially in partnership with the Canadian Press, the Royal Canadian Mounted Police utilized facsimile equipment to transmit photographs and fingerprints of criminals.

=== Wireless transmission ===
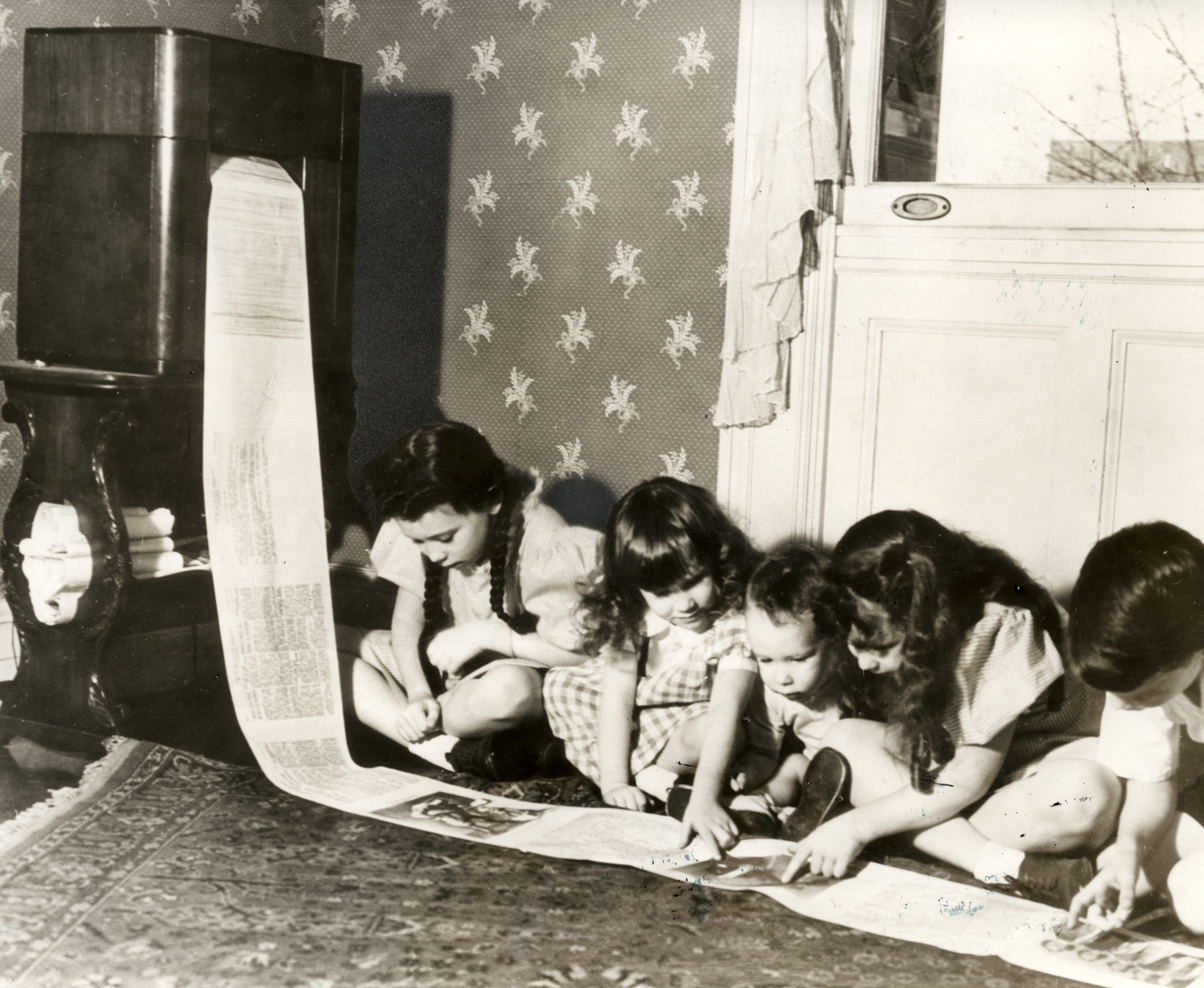
Children read a wirelessly transmitted newspaper in 1938.

As a designer for the Radio Corporation of America (RCA), in 1924, Richard H. Ranger invented the wireless photoradiogram, or transoceanic radio facsimile, the forerunner of today's "fax" machines. A photograph of President Calvin Coolidge sent from New York to London on November 29, 1924, became the first photo picture reproduced by transoceanic radio facsimile. Commercial use of Ranger's product began two years later. Also in 1924, Herbert E. Ives of AT&T transmitted and reconstructed the first color facsimile, a natural-color photograph of silent film star Rudolph Valentino in period costume, using red, green and blue color separations.

Beginning in the late 1930s, the Finch Facsimile system was used to transmit a "radio newspaper" to private homes via commercial AM radio stations and ordinary radio receivers equipped with Finch's printer, which used thermal paper. Sensing a new and potentially golden opportunity, competitors soon entered the field, but the printer and special paper were expensive luxuries, AM radio transmission was very slow and vulnerable to static, and the newspaper was too small. After more than ten years of repeated attempts by Finch and others to establish such a service as a viable business, the public, apparently quite content with its cheaper and much more substantial home-delivered daily newspapers, and with conventional spoken radio bulletins to provide any "hot" news, still showed only a passing curiosity about the new medium.

By the late 1940s, radiofax receivers were sufficiently miniaturized to be fitted beneath the dashboard of Western Union's "Telecar" telegram delivery vehicles.

In the 1960s, the United States Army transmitted the first photograph via satellite facsimile to Puerto Rico from the Deal Test Site using the Courier satellite.

Radio fax is still in limited use today for transmitting weather charts and information to ships at sea. The closely related technology of slow-scan television is still used by amateur radio operators.

=== Telephone transmission ===
In 1964, Xerox Corporation introduced (and patented) what many consider to be the first commercialized version of the modern fax machine, under the name (LDX) or Long Distance Xerography. This model was superseded two years later with a unit that would set the standard for fax machines for years to come. Up until this point facsimile machines were very expensive and hard to operate. In 1966, Xerox released the Magnafax Telecopiers, a smaller, 46 lb (21 kg) facsimile machine. This unit was far easier to operate and could be connected to any standard telephone line. This machine was capable of transmitting a letter-sized document in about six minutes. The first sub-minute, digital fax machine was developed by Dacom, which built on digital data compression technology originally developed at Lockheed for satellite communication.

Analog facsimile machines worked by optical scanning of a document or drawing spinning on a drum. The reflected light, varying in intensity according to the light and dark areas of the document, was focused on a photocell so that the current in a circuit varied with the amount of light. This current was used to control a tone generator (a modulator), the current determining the frequency of the tone produced. This audio tone was then transmitted using an acoustic coupler (a speaker, in this case) attached to the microphone of a common telephone handset. At the receiving end, a handset's speaker was attached to an acoustic coupler (a microphone), and a demodulator converted the varying tone into a variable current that controlled the mechanical movement of a pen or pencil to reproduce the image on a blank sheet of paper on an identical drum rotating at the same rate.

=== Digital transmission and height of popularity ===
By the late 1970s, many companies around the world (especially Japanese firms) had entered the fax market, and prices for long-distance faxing in 1978 were significantly lower than they had been in 1968, both at high and low speeds. Faxes had become useful to large newspapers and multinational corporations, and some digital methods were being developed. However, the rise of the market was fairly slow. Individual manufacturers had purposefully developed incompatible transmission methods in order to prevent their customers from buying from competitors. The CCITT (later ITU-T) Recommendation T.3, defining group 2 fax machines, was the first to offer interoperability in 1976, with a speed of three minutes per page.

In 1980, the CCITT's Recommendation T.4 promised groundbreaking interoperability for digital fax machines, with transmission times of just 40 seconds per page. Accompanying this, a new wave of more compact, faster and efficient fax machines hit the market, leading to two decades of ubiquitous faxing in business contexts. Xerox continued to refine the fax machine for years after their ground-breaking first machine. In later years it would be combined with copier equipment to create the modern hybrid machines that copy, scan and fax. Some of the lesser known capabilities of the Xerox fax technologies included their Ethernet enabled Fax Services on their 8000 workstations in the early 1980s.

In 1985, Hank Magnuski, founder of GammaLink, produced the first computer fax board, called GammaFax. Such boards could provide voice telephony via Analog Expansion Bus.

=== In the 21st century ===
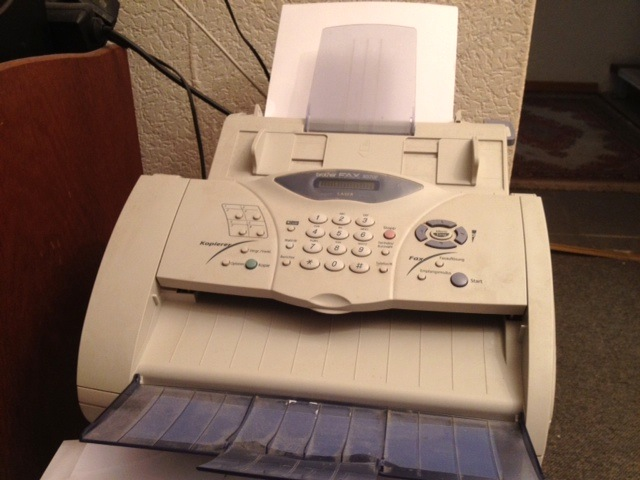
Laser fax with a compact, built-in laser printer, 2001

Although businesses usually maintain some kind of fax capability, the technology has faced increasing competition from Internet-based alternatives. In some countries, because electronic signatures on contracts are not yet recognized by law while faxed contracts with copies of signatures are, fax machines enjoy continuing support in business. In Japan, faxes were still being used extensively in 2025 for cultural reasons, including a widespread preference for handwriting over typing. They are available for sending to both domestic and international recipients from over 81% of all convenience stores nationwide. Convenience-store fax machines commonly print the slightly re-sized content of the sent fax in the electronic confirmation-slip, in A4 paper size. Use of fax machines for reporting cases during the COVID-19 pandemic has been criticised in Japan for introducing data errors and delays in reporting, slowing response efforts to contain the spread of infections and hindering the transition to remote work. The same issue has occurred in Germany and the United States. In Germany, some districts in Berlin reported zero cases for seven consecutive days. The reason was that the local health department in these districts only had fax machines and could not accurately report the number of infected individuals.

In many corporate environments, freestanding fax machines have been replaced by fax servers and other computerized systems capable of receiving and storing incoming faxes electronically, and then routing them to users on paper or via an email (which may be secured). Such systems have the advantage of reducing costs by eliminating unnecessary printouts and reducing the number of inbound analog phone lines needed by an office.

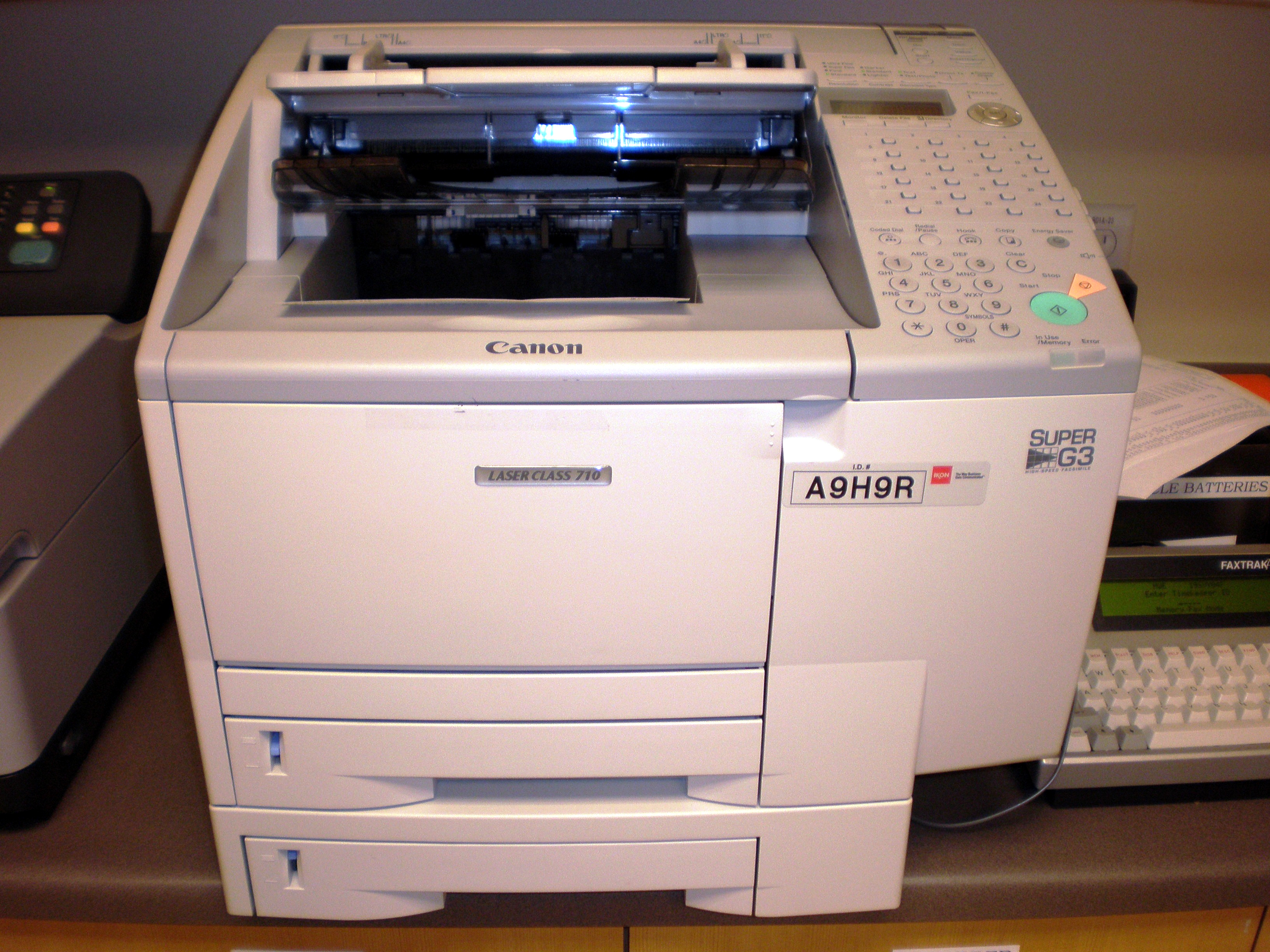
Professional laser fax machine for office use with the Super G3 standard for faster transmission

The once ubiquitous fax machine has also begun to disappear from the small office and home office environments. Remotely hosted fax-server services are widely available from VoIP and e-mail providers. Users can send and receive faxes using them with their existing e-mail accounts instead of dedicated hardware and fax lines. Personal computers have also long been able to handle incoming and outgoing faxes using analog modems or ISDN. These solutions are often ideally suited for users who only very occasionally need to use fax services. In July 2017 the United Kingdom's National Health Service was said to be the world's largest purchaser of fax machines because the digital revolution has largely bypassed it. In June 2018 the Labour Party said that the NHS had at least 11,620 fax machines in operation and in December the Department of Health and Social Care said that no more fax machines could be bought from 2019 and that the existing ones must be replaced by secure email by March 31, 2020.

Leeds Teaching Hospitals NHS Trust, generally viewed as digitally advanced in the NHS, was engaged in a process of removing its fax machines in early 2019. This involved quite a lot of e-fax solutions because of the need to communicate with pharmacies and nursing homes which may not have access to the NHS email system and may need something in their paper records.

In 2018 two-thirds of Canadian doctors reported that they primarily used fax machines to communicate with other doctors. Faxes are still seen as safer and more secure and electronic systems are often unable to communicate with each other.

Hospitals are the leading users for fax machines in the United States where some doctors prefer fax machines over emails, often due to concerns about accidentally violating HIPAA.

== Capabilities ==
There are several indicators of fax capabilities: group, class, data transmission rate, and conformance with ITU-T (formerly CCITT) recommendations. Since the 1968 Carterfone decision, most fax machines have been designed to connect to standard PSTN lines and telephone numbers.

=== Group ===
==== Analog ====
Group 1 and 2 faxes are sent in the same manner as a frame of analog television, with each scanned line transmitted as a continuous analog signal. Horizontal resolution depended upon the quality of the scanner, transmission line, and the printer. Analog fax machines are obsolete and no longer manufactured. ITU-T Recommendations T.2 and T.3 were withdrawn as obsolete in July 1996.

- Group 1 faxes conform to the ITU-T Recommendation T.2. Group 1 faxes take six minutes to transmit a single page, with a vertical resolution of 96 scan lines per inch. Group 1 fax machines are obsolete and no longer manufactured.
- Group 2 faxes conform to the ITU-T Recommendations T.3 and T.30. Group 2 faxes take three minutes to transmit a single page, with a vertical resolution of 96 scan lines per inch. Group 2 fax machines are almost obsolete, and are no longer manufactured. Group 2 fax machines can interoperate with Group 3 fax machines.

==== Digital ====
The Dacom DFC-10—the first digital fax machine

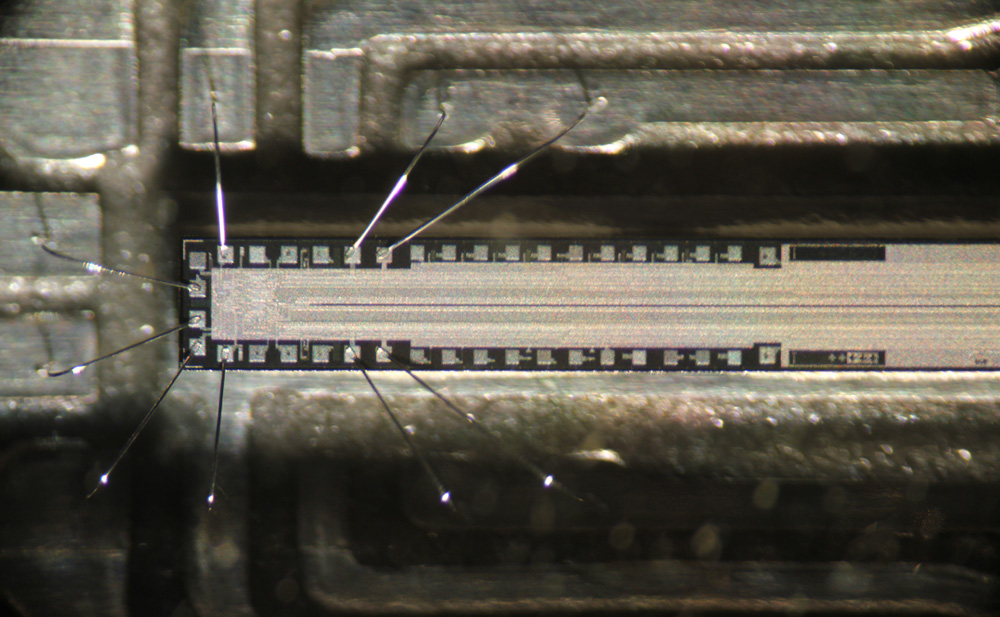
The CCD single-row image sensor in a fax machine. Only about one quarter of the length is shown. The thin line in the middle consists of photosensitive pixels. The read-out circuit is at left.

A major breakthrough in the development of the modern facsimile system was the result of digital technology, where the analog signal from scanners was digitized and then compressed, resulting in the ability to transmit high rates of data across standard phone lines. The first digital fax machine was the Dacom Rapidfax first sold in late 1960s, which incorporated digital data compression technology developed by Lockheed for transmission of images from satellites.

Group 3 and 4 faxes are digital formats and take advantage of digital compression methods to greatly reduce transmission times.

- Group 3 faxes conform to the ITU-T Recommendations T.30 and T.4. Group 3 faxes take between 6 and 15 seconds to transmit a single page (not including the initial time for the fax machines to handshake and synchronize). They require sufficient random access memory to store two lines of scanned bits at a time. The horizontal and vertical resolutions are allowed by the T.4 standard to vary among a set of fixed resolutions:
  - Horizontal: 100 scan lines per inch
    - Vertical: 100 scan lines per inch ("Basic")
  - Horizontal: 200 or 204 scan lines per inch
    - Vertical: 100 or 98 scan lines per inch ("Standard")
    - Vertical: 200 or 196 scan lines per inch ("Fine")
    - Vertical: 400 or 391 (note not 392) scan lines per inch ("Superfine")
  - Horizontal: 300 scan lines per inch
    - Vertical: 300 scan lines per inch
  - Horizontal: 400 or 408 scan lines per inch
    - Vertical: 400 or 391 scan lines per inch ("Ultrafine")
- Group 4 faxes are designed to operate over 64 kbit/s digital ISDN circuits. They conform to the ITU-T Recommendations
  - T.563 (Terminal characteristics for Group 4 facsimile apparatus),
  - T.503 (Document application profile for the interchange of Group 4 facsimile documents),
  - T.521 (Communication application profile BT0 for document bulk transfer based on the session service),
  - T.6 (Facsimile coding schemes and coding control functions for Group 4 facsimile apparatus) specifying resolutions, a superset of the resolutions from T.4,
  - T.62 (Control procedures for teletex and Group 4 facsimile services),
  - T.70 (Network-independent basic transport service for the telematic services), and
  - T.411 to T.417 (concerned with aspects of the Open Document Architecture).

Fax Over IP (FoIP) can transmit and receive pre-digitized documents using ITU-T recommendation T.38 to send digitised images over an IP network using JPEG compression. T.38 is designed to work with VoIP services and often supported by analog telephone adapters used by legacy fax machines that need to connect through a VoIP service. Scanned documents are limited to the amount of time the user takes to load the document in a scanner and for the device to process a digital file. The resolution can vary from as little as 150 DPI to 9600 DPI or more. This type of faxing is not related to the e-mail–to–fax service that still uses fax modems at least one way.

=== Class ===
Computer modems are often designated by a particular fax class, which indicates how much processing is offloaded from the computer's CPU to the fax modem.

- Class 1 (also known as Class 1.0) fax devices do fax data transfer, while the T.4/T.6 data compression and T.30 session management are performed by software on a controlling computer. This is described in ITU-T recommendation T.31.
- What is commonly known as "Class 2" is an unofficial class of fax devices that perform T.30 session management themselves, but the T.4/T.6 data compression is performed by software on a controlling computer. Implementations of this "class" are based on draft versions of the standard that eventually significantly evolved to become Class 2.0. All implementations of "Class 2" are manufacturer-specific.
- Class 2.0 is the official ITU-T version of Class 2 and is commonly known as Class 2.0 to differentiate it from many manufacturer-specific implementations of what is commonly known as "Class 2". It uses a different but standardized command set than the various manufacturer-specific implementations of "Class 2". The relevant ITU-T recommendation is T.32.
- Class 2.1 is an improvement of Class 2.0 that implements faxing over V.34 (33.6 kbit/s), which boosts faxing speed from fax classes "2" and 2.0, which are limited to 14.4 kbit/s. The relevant ITU-T recommendation is T.32 Amendment 1. Class 2.1 fax devices are referred to as "super G3".

=== Data transmission rate ===
Several different telephone-line modulation techniques are used by fax machines. They are negotiated during the fax-modem handshake, and the fax devices will use the highest data rate that both fax devices support, usually a minimum of 14.4 kbit/s for Group 3 fax.

ITU standard	Released date	Data rates (bit/s)	Modulation method
V.27	1988	4800, 2400	PSK
V.29	1988	9600, 7200, 4800	QAM
V.17	1991	14400, 12000, 9600, 7200	TCM
V.34	1994	28800	QAM
V.34bis	1998	33600	QAM
ISDN	1986	64000	4B3T / 2B1Q (line coding)

"Super Group 3" faxes use V.34bis modulation that allows a data rate of up to 33.6 kbit/s.

=== Compression ===
As well as specifying the resolution (and allowable physical size) of the image being faxed, the ITU-T T.4 recommendation specifies two compression methods for decreasing the amount of data that needs to be transmitted between the fax machines to transfer the image. The two methods defined in T.4 are:

- Modified Huffman (MH).
- Modified READ (MR) (Relative Element Address Designate), optional.

An additional method is specified in T.6:

- Modified Modified READ (MMR).

Later, other compression techniques were added as options to ITU-T recommendation T.30, such as the more efficient JBIG (T.82, T.85) for bi-level content, and JPEG (T.81), T.43, MRC (T.44), and T.45 for grayscale, palette, and colour content. Fax machines can negotiate at the start of the T.30 session to use the best technique implemented on both sides.

==== Modified Huffman ====
Modified Huffman (MH), specified in T.4 as the one-dimensional coding scheme, is a codebook-based run-length encoding scheme optimised to efficiently compress whitespace. As most faxes consist mostly of white space, this minimises the transmission time of most faxes. Each line scanned is compressed independently of its predecessor and successor.

==== Modified READ ====
Modified READ, specified as an optional two-dimensional coding scheme in T.4, encodes the first scanned line using MH. The next line is compared to the first, the differences determined, and then the differences are encoded and transmitted. This is effective, as most lines differ little from their predecessor. This is not continued to the end of the fax transmission, but only for a limited number of lines until the process is reset, and a new "first line" encoded with MH is produced. This limited number of lines is to prevent errors propagating throughout the whole fax, as the standard does not provide for error correction. This is an optional facility, and some fax machines do not use MR in order to minimise the amount of computation required by the machine. The limited number of lines is 2 for "Standard"-resolution faxes, and 4 for "Fine"-resolution faxes.

==== Modified Modified READ ====
The ITU-T T.6 recommendation adds a further compression type of Modified Modified READ (MMR), which simply allows a greater number of lines to be coded by MR than in T.4. This is because T.6 makes the assumption that the transmission is over a circuit with a low number of line errors, such as digital ISDN. In this case, the number of lines for which the differences are encoded is not limited.

==== JBIG ====
In 1999, ITU-T recommendation T.30 added JBIG (ITU-T T.82) as another lossless bi-level compression algorithm, or more precisely a "fax profile" subset of JBIG (ITU-T T.85). JBIG-compressed pages result in 20% to 50% faster transmission than MMR-compressed pages, and up to 30 times faster transmission if the page includes halftone images.

JBIG performs adaptive compression, that is, both the encoder and decoder collect statistical information about the transmitted image from the pixels transmitted so far, in order to predict the probability for each next pixel being either black or white. For each new pixel, JBIG looks at ten nearby, previously transmitted pixels. It counts, how often in the past the next pixel has been black or white in the same neighborhood, and estimates from that the probability distribution of the next pixel. This is fed into an arithmetic coder, which adds only a small fraction of a bit to the output sequence if the more probable pixel is then encountered.

The ITU-T T.85 "fax profile" constrains some optional features of the full JBIG standard, such that codecs do not have to keep data about more than the last three pixel rows of an image in memory at any time. This allows the streaming of "endless" images, where the height of the image may not be known until the last row is transmitted.

ITU-T T.30 allows fax machines to negotiate one of two options of the T.85 "fax profile":

- In "basic mode", the JBIG encoder must split the image into horizontal stripes of 128 lines (parameter L0 = 128) and restart the arithmetic encoder for each stripe.
- In "option mode", there is no such constraint.

==== Matsushita Whiteline Skip ====
A proprietary compression scheme employed on Panasonic fax machines is Matsushita Whiteline Skip (MWS). It can be overlaid on the other compression schemes, but is operative only when two Panasonic machines are communicating with one another. This system detects the blank scanned areas between lines of text, and then compresses several blank scan lines into the data space of a single character. (JBIG implements a similar technique called "typical prediction", if header flag TPBON is set to 1.)

=== Typical characteristics ===
Group 3 fax machines transfer one or a few printed or handwritten pages per minute in black-and-white (bitonal) at a resolution of 204×98 (normal) or 204×196 (fine) dots per square inch. The transfer rate is 14.4 kbit/s or higher for modems and some fax machines, but fax machines support speeds beginning with 2400 bit/s and typically operate at 9600 bit/s. The transferred image formats are called ITU-T (formerly CCITT) fax group 3 or 4. Group 3 faxes have the suffix .g3 and the MIME type image/g3fax.

The most basic fax mode transfers in black and white only. The original page is scanned in a resolution of 1728 pixels/line and 1145 lines/page (for A4). The resulting raw data is compressed using a modified Huffman code optimized for written text, achieving average compression factors of around 20. Typically a page needs 10 s for transmission, instead of about three minutes for the same uncompressed raw data of 1728×1145 bits at a speed of 9600 bit/s. The compression method uses a Huffman codebook for run lengths of black and white runs in a single scanned line, and it can also use the fact that two adjacent scanlines are usually quite similar, saving bandwidth by encoding only the differences.

Fax classes denote the way fax programs interact with fax hardware. Available classes include Class 1, Class 2, Class 2.0 and 2.1, and Intel CAS. Many modems support at least class 1 and often either Class 2 or Class 2.0. Which is preferable to use depends on factors such as hardware, software, modem firmware, and expected use.

=== Printing process ===
Fax machines from the 1970s to the 1990s often used direct thermal printers with rolls of thermal paper as their printing technology, but in the mid-1990s a transition was made towards plain-paper faxes: thermal transfer printers, inkjet printers and laser printers.

One of the advantages of inkjet printing is that inkjets can affordably print in color; therefore, many of the inkjet-based fax machines claim to have color fax capability. The standard ITU-T30e (formally ITU-T Recommendation T.30 Annex E) exists for faxing in color; however, it is not widely supported, so many of the color fax machines can only fax in color to machines from the same manufacturer.

=== Stroke speed ===
Stroke speed in facsimile systems is the rate at which a fixed line perpendicular to the direction of scanning is crossed in one direction by a scanning or recording spot. Stroke speed is usually expressed as a number of strokes per minute. When the fax system scans in both directions, the stroke speed is twice this number. In most conventional 20th century mechanical systems, the stroke speed is equivalent to drum speed.

=== Fax paper ===
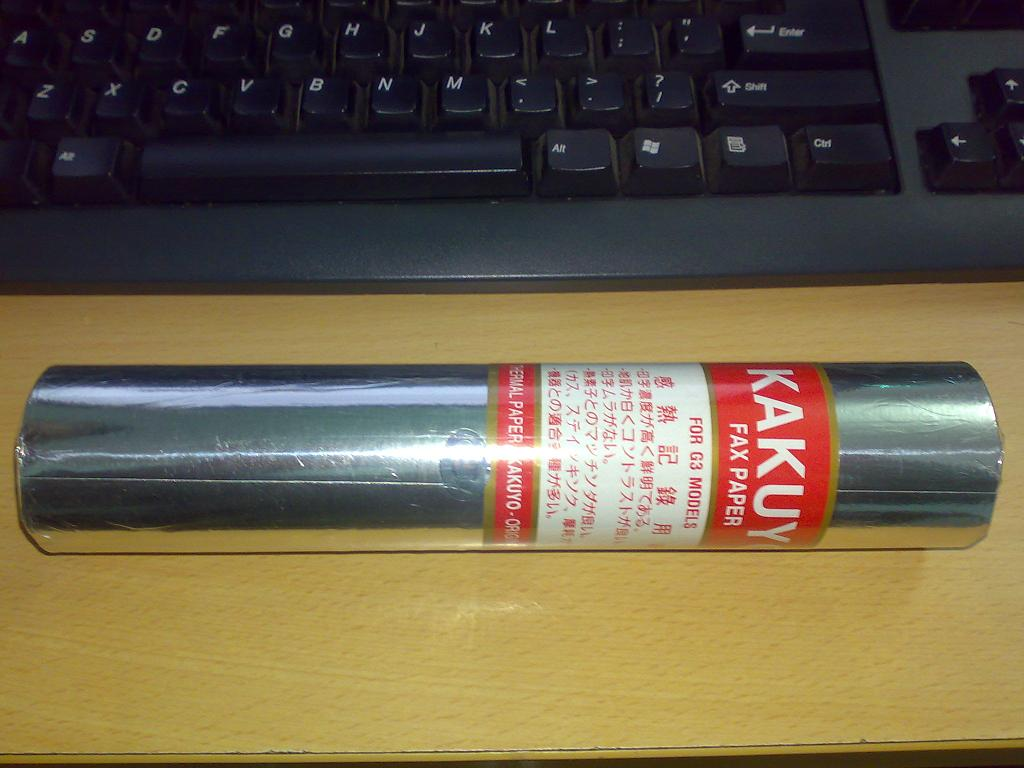
Paper roll for direct thermal fax machine

As a precaution, thermal fax paper is typically not accepted in archives or as documentary evidence in some courts of law unless photocopied. This is because the image-forming coating is eradicable and brittle, and it tends to detach from the medium after a long time in storage.

=== Fax tone ===
The distinctive "fax tone," often described as a series of high-pitched whistles and beeps, is technically known as the handshake signal and is mandated by the International Telecommunication Union (ITU) T.30 standard. When a fax machine calls another, it first sends a Calling Tone (CNG) at 1100 Hz to signal its intent to send a fax. The receiving machine responds with a Called Station Identification (CED) tone and then proceeds through a complex digital protocol negotiation. This negotiation, which includes sending Digital Identification Signals (DIS) and Digital Command Signals (DCS), establishes crucial parameters for the session, such as the highest mutually acceptable transmission speed, resolution, error correction mode (ECM), and compression method. The resulting tone is the audible manifestation of these modems synchronizing and agreeing on the communication rules before the image data transfer (phasing out the tone) begins.

== Internet fax ==
One popular alternative is to subscribe to an Internet fax service and send and receive faxes from a personal computers using an existing email account. No software, fax server or fax machine is needed. Faxes are received as attached TIFF or PDF files, or in proprietary formats that require the use of the service provider's software. Faxes can be sent or retrieved from anywhere at any time that a user can get Internet access. Some services offer secure faxing to comply with stringent HIPAA and Gramm–Leach–Bliley Act requirements to keep medical information and financial information private and secure. Utilizing a fax service provider does not require paper, a dedicated fax line, or consumable resources.

Another alternative to a physical fax machine is to make use of computer software which sends and receives faxes utilizing fax servers and unified messaging. A virtual (email) fax can be printed out and then signed and scanned back into a computer to be emailed. Also the sender can attach a digital signature to the document file.

With the surging popularity of mobile phones, virtual fax machines can now be downloaded as applications for Android and iOS. These applications make use of the phone's internal camera to scan fax documents for upload or they can import from various cloud services.

== Related standards ==
- T.4 is the umbrella specification for fax. It specifies the standard image sizes, two forms of image-data compression (encoding), the image-data format, and references, T.30 and the various modem standards.
- T.6 specifies a compression scheme that reduces the time required to transmit an image by roughly 50-percent.
- T.30 specifies the procedures that a sending and receiving terminal use to set up a fax call, determine the image size, encoding, and transfer speed, the demarcation between pages, and the termination of the call. T.30 also references the various modem standards.
- V.21, V.27ter, V.29, V.17, V.34: ITU modem standards used in facsimile. The first three were ratified prior to 1980, and were specified in the original T.4 and T.30 standards. V.34 was published for fax in 1994.
- T.37 The ITU standard for sending a fax-image file via e-mail to the intended recipient of a fax.
- T.38 The ITU standard for sending Fax over IP (FoIP).
- G.711 pass through — this is where the T.30 fax call is carried in a VoIP call encoded as audio. This is sensitive to network packet loss, jitter and clock synchronization. When using voice high-compression encoding techniques such as, but not limited to, G.729, some fax tonal signals may not be correctly transported across the packet network.
- RFC 3362 image/t38 MIME-type
- SSL Fax An emerging standard that allows a telephone based fax session to negotiate a fax transfer over the internet, but only if both sides support the standard. The standard is partially based on T.30 and is being developed by Hylafax+ developers.

== See also ==
- 3D Fax
- Black fax
- Called subscriber identification (CSID)
- Error correction mode (ECM)
- Fax art
- Fax demodulator
- Fax modem
- Fax server
- Faxlore
- Fultograph
- Image scanner
- Junk fax
- Radiofax—image transmission over HF radio
- Slow-scan television
- T.38 Fax-over-IP
- Telautograph
- Telex
- Teletex
- Transmitting Subscriber Identification (TSID)
- Wirephoto
