= Error correction mode =

Error correction mode (ECM) is an optional transmission mode built into Class 1/2/2.0 fax machines or fax modems. ECM automatically detects and corrects errors in the fax transmission process that are sometimes caused by telephone line noise.

The page data is divided into what is known as Octets (small blocks of data). Once the receiver has received all the Octets it examines them (using check-sums) and then advises the transmitting fax of any Octets that are in error. The transmitter then need only resend the blocks in error rather than the whole page. This generally means an ECM coded fax will be more likely to succeed in transmitting a copy of the page(s) on a noisy line. ECM is the norm rather than the exception. Some fax machines have the capability to enable or disable this function.
