= Emio – The Smiling Man: Famicom Detective Club =

2024 adventure game

- Cover art
- Developers: Nintendo EPD; Mages
- Publisher: Nintendo
- Producers: Yoshio Sakamoto; Makoto Asada
- Programmers: Tamiya Kadomatsu; Daisuke Shinada; Yuichiro Konno
- Artist: Yukihiro Matsuo
- Writers: Yoshio Sakamoto; Kaori Miyachi
- Composer: Takeshi Abo
- Series: Famicom Detective Club
- Platform: Nintendo Switch
- Release: August 29, 2024
- Genres: Adventure, visual novel
- Mode: Single-player

Emio – The Smiling Man: Famicom Detective Club (Note: Japanese: ファミコン探偵倶楽部 笑み男, Hepburn: Famikon Tantei Kurabu Emio; "Famicom Detective Club Smile Man") is a 2024 adventure video game developed by Nintendo and Mages and published by Nintendo for the Nintendo Switch. It is the fourth installment of the Famicom Detective Club series and is its first new title in 27 years, since 1997's BS Tantei Club: Yuki ni Kieta Kako.

The game was first revealed on July 10, 2024, with a short teaser video. The teaser and the official announcement prompted online traction, with many noting its cryptic nature and dark tone.

== Gameplay ==
Emio allows the player to interact with the game in multiple ways, including talking to characters and thinking.

Emio – The Smiling Man is an adventure game and visual novel. The gameplay is similar to the gameplay of the Nintendo Switch remakes of Famicom Detective Club, where the player progresses the story by using commands such as moving to other areas, listening to other characters, and investigating. The player controls an assistant private investigator investigating a murder. During some segments of the game, the player will control fellow investigator Ayumi Tachibana.

== Plot ==
Emio – The Smiling Man is set in Japan, following the apparent murder of a junior high school boy. This murder is tied to an urban legend of a serial killer called Emio from 18 years ago who wears a smiling paper bag mask and trench coat. In the game's story, the Smiling Man is said to offer crying girls a paper bag with a smile drawn on it in exchange for their lives. The protagonist, an assistant private investigator at the Utsugi Detective Agency, is working with the police to investigate this murder.

== Development and release ==
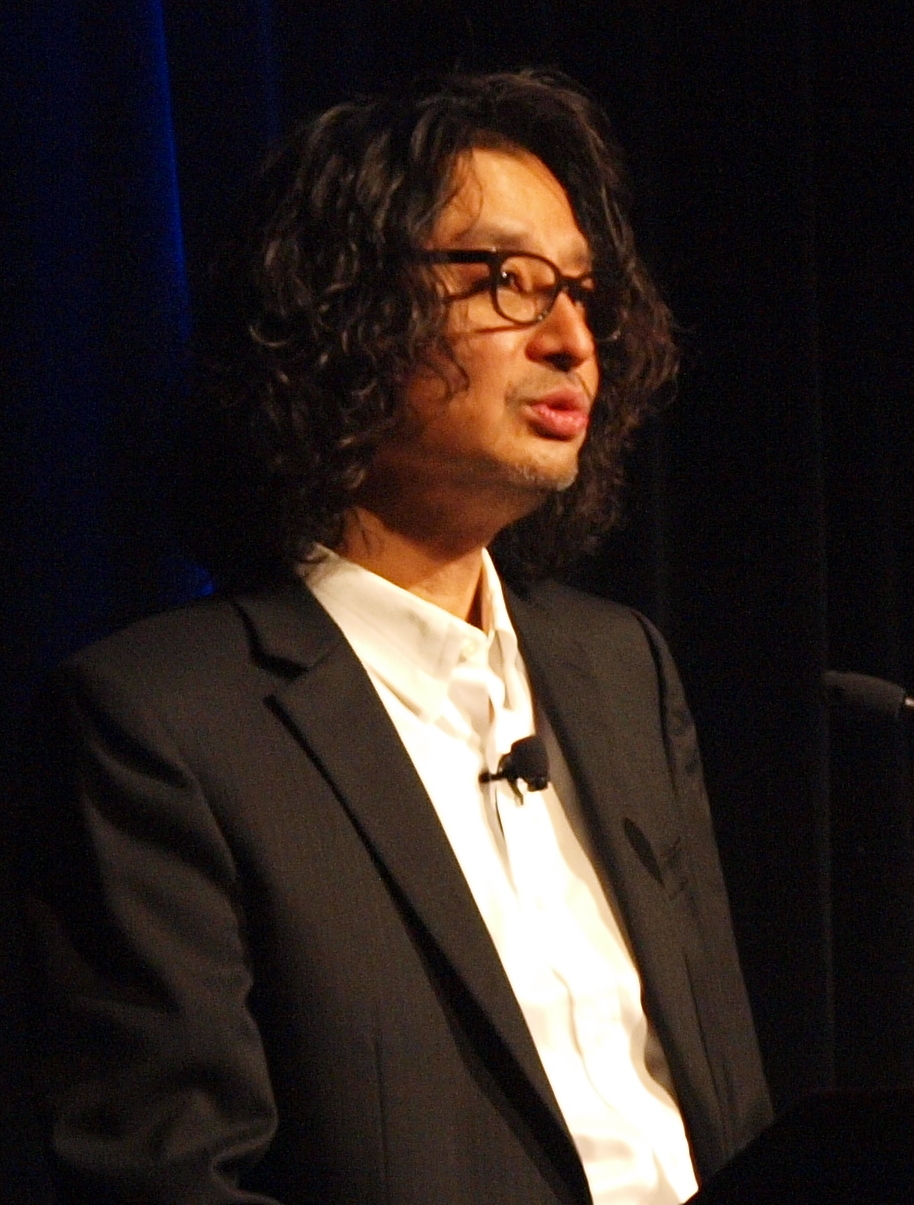
Writer and Producer Yoshio Sakamoto in 2010

Emio – The Smiling Man was designed by Yoshio Sakamoto, who worked on previous entries in the Famicom Detective Club series. Sakamoto worked on every aspect of the game, including the plot, script, and cutscenes. During development of the Nintendo Switch remakes of the Famicom Detective Club duology, Sakamoto expressed a desire to continue the series through the creation of a new entry. Sakamoto designed the game to center around an urban legend instead of a ghost story due to his belief that it was more vivid due to it being "grounded in reality." He intended the player's perception of the case to change as they learn more about the urban legend's background. Sakamoto described the game as being the culmination of everything he and his "most-trusted colleagues" learned from working on the Famicom Detective Club series. In a 2021 interview, Mages director Makoto Asada expressed interest in developing a new Famicom Detective Club entry. It is the first new Famicom Detective Club game released in the past 27 years. Emio – The Smiling Man is developed by Nintendo EPD and Mages, the studio that developed the 2021 remake of the first two Famicom Detective Club installments.

Emio – The Smiling Man was first revealed via a teaser trailer shared through Nintendo's US, Europe, and Japanese X accounts with the hashtag #WhoIsEmio? There was also an official website for the game that, at the time, showed a "creepy man" standing with a smiling paper bag mask and trench coat, occasionally changing his expression, with kanji behind him that reads "Emio," which translates to "laughing man" or "smiling man." In the Australian trailer, the content rating mentioned suicide and murder as content depicted in the game. On July 17, 2024, it was revealed that it was an entry in the Famicom Detective Club series. It was released on August 29, 2024. The English version of the game features English, French, German, Italian, and Spanish text options, though the voiceover is only available in Japanese. It was released on both digital and physical worldwide, with a Collector's Edition that is exclusive to Japan including the game, an artbook, a replica of a piece of evidence, and soundtrack CDs. A demo was released in three parts, each on different dates: Prologue & Chapter 1 (August 19 / 20, 2024), Chapter 2 (August 22 / 23, 2024), Chapter 3 (August 27 / 28, 2024).

== Reception ==
=== Pre-release ===
The teaser trailer received commentary due to the difference in tone between it and Nintendo's typical output.

The initial teaser trailer was the subject of commentary and speculation by critics and people on social media. Speculation occurred that it was an internally developed Nintendo title due to having a site on Nintendo.com. Other speculation argued that developer Bloober Team was involved due to their recent announcement of a game codenamed Project M for Nintendo platforms. According to Eurogamer, other clues found in an interview with Bloober Team's CEO Piotr Babieno include him speaking of the importance of the project and "world's best game creators for Nintendo platforms."

=== Western reception ===
The Mary Sue writer Kirsten Carey noted that this was the first age-restricted video from Nintendo's YouTube account. According to Carey, influencers close to Nintendo were unaware of what it could be, praising its "minimalist social media campaign" as "brilliant marketing." They speculated that it would be the first M-rated title developed internally by Nintendo. GamePro writer David Whey commented that the teaser trailer was an unusual way for Nintendo to announce a game, arguing that they typically revealed games during Nintendo Directs. He stated that this made the trailer more exciting. GamesRadar+ writer Jordan Gerblick felt that the method of revealing the game was also unusual due to the lack of context and not being shown in a Nintendo Direct. Gerblick also argued that this was an unusual trailer for Nintendo to produce, considering the tone uncharacteristic for a game they believed was developed internally. Gerblick expressed excitement about the prospect of a Mature-rated title developed by Nintendo, stating that it was an unprecedented thing for the company. Fellow GamesRadar writer Jasmine Gould-Wilson was similarly excited for Emio, feeling that an "in-house horror game" could make them take the Switch seriously. They discussed the trailer's "insidious horror aesthetics," citing things like the "celluloid crackle of damaged tape recordings [and] the discordant piano keys trembling behind them." She also discussed how the titular Smiling Man evokes Japanese body horror, comparing it to the video game Slitterhead. Gould-Wilson argued that Nintendo's reputation as a family-friendly company also contributed to the unprecedented nature of the trailer. She compared it to The Legend of Zelda: Breath of the Wild and Tears of the Kingdom, games she believed "widen[ed] the scope" of what Nintendo has to offer.

=== Post-release ===
Reception

Aggregate scores
Aggregator	Score
Metacritic	74/100
OpenCritic	65% recommend

Review scores
Publication	Score
Destructoid	7.5/10
Eurogamer	3/5
Famitsu	8/10, 8/10, 8/10, 7/10
Nintendo Life	7/10
Shacknews	8/10
Video Games Chronicle	3/5
Siliconera	8/10

Emio – The Smiling Man garnered "mixed or average" reviews, according to review aggregator site Metacritic, with 65% of critics recommending the game, according to OpenCritic. Praise was generally levied towards the game's narrative and presentation. James Galizio of RPG Site was left impressed by the cast of characters, remarking that "Emio isn't just content with telling a story about a murderer, but rather painting a picture of the stain that this violence has left on the people the victims have left behind." Cullen Black of Nintendo Insider likewise deemed it a "wonderfully constructed mystery" and complimented the visuals as "often feeling more like a long interactive anime than a static ADV title." In contrast, opinions on the gameplay were mixed. Vooks writer Oliver Brandt enjoyed the gameplay, highlighting how its improved hint system compared to prior installments allowed the story to maintain "a satisfying flow." Meanwhile, Here & Now producer and writer James Perkins Mastromarino remarked that while it was capable of aiding the tense atmosphere of some sequences, the way Emio approached navigating conversations could often be "torpid and tedious".

Emio – The Smiling Man was nominated for "Best Storytelling" at the 2024 Golden Joystick Awards. The game also won "Best Adventure" at the Famitsu Dengeki Awards for 2024.

=== Sales ===
Emio – The Smiling Man was the fifth best-selling retail game during its first week of release in Japan, selling 25,028 physical copies.
