= Digital Chicken =

Digital Chicken was among the earliest implementations of an Internet email to fax gateway, active for several months during the mid-1990s.

The Toronto-based gateway was created by Dr. Robert Riley through Internet service provider Planet Communications. When email was sent to one of the designated addresses, the text was transmitted as fax to a designated party such as a Canadian government agency. For example, an email sent to ontatg@chicken.planet.org was converted to a fax transmission to the Attorney General of Ontario. The service initially lacked a formal domain name, therefore email routing of the form "utgpu!plan9!chyk!" was required until late 1993.

Many of these "@chicken.planet.org" addresses were included in Seth Godin's book, E-mail Addresses of the Rich and Famous (ISBN 0-201-40893-7, Addison-Wesley, 1994), although these addresses were not maintained by the recipients.

Digital Chicken's hosting was changed from Planet Communications to UUNET in November 1993. The arrangements with Planet were terminated because of what Riley indicated were "complaints from certain government agencies". Digital Chicken was discontinued entirely in May 1994. By that time, The Phone Company (tpc.int) had established email-fax gateway coverage for Toronto.
