= Dacom =

Fax and data company

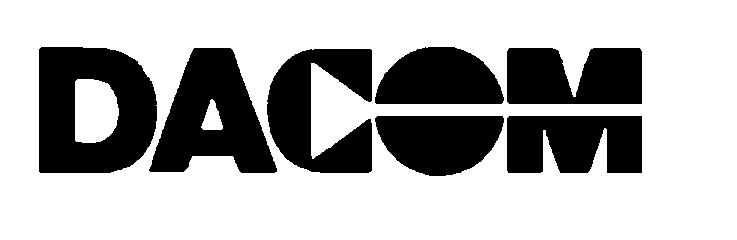
- Industry: Fax and Data Compression
- Founded: 1966
- Founder: Daniel Hochman and Donald Weber
- Headquarters: Santa Clara, USA
- Area served: Global
- Products: Dacom Rapidfax 100, Dacom DFC-10, Dacom 111 Receiver, Dacom 212, Rapidfax 412

Dacom, Inc. was founded in 1966 by two ex-Lockheed engineers, Daniel Hochman, President, and Don Weber, Vice President, building on their pioneering work on digital image compression invented for satellite communications. Their work resulted in the first commercial digital fax machine and later the first sub-minute facsimile transmission over a single standard phone line. In 1973 Dacom was recipient of the IR-100 Award (the name was later changed to the R&D 100 Awards) for the most significant new product in Information Technology. The patents and technology developed by Dacom have become the foundation of the modern desktop fax machine.

== History ==
From the late 1950s Daniel Hochman, a pioneer in digital electronics, was head of a division of Lockheed Missiles & Space Company in Sunnyvale, California. In 1959 Hochman's team at Lockheed unveiled a 9-pound miniature television system that could transmit pictures from as far as 1000 miles in space, and in the early 1960s was working to develop a high-speed communications system for the transmission of images from space. The team faced two related problems: the density of data of a high-resolution photograph, and the low-power, low-capacity transmitters on board satellites. To address these problems, Hochman brought in Donald Weber to work on the problem of data compression - to achieve a higher rate of data transmitted with the same low-power equipment.

In 1966 Hochman and Weber realized the potential application of the technology they had invented to create a digital facsimile machine, capable of transmitting images over a standard phone line in considerably less time than the then-current state-of-the-art analog facsimile machines offered by Xerox, Magnavox, and Stewart Warner. They left Lockheed to form their own company: Dacom (which stood for Data Compression).

The first systems were models DFC-10 and the Dacom 111, which came to market in the late 1960s. Hochman and Weber presented Dacom's data compression technology at the 1970 International Conference on Communications in a paper which has been since cited as a seminal work in the field of image digitization and data compression. The company was awarded a number of patents that constitute the foundation of modern data compression and facsimile transmission (see table below).

1971 brought a partnership with CBS and Savin to provide both development funds and commercial distribution for Dacom. Savin was a major distributor of Ricoh products at the time. The joint venture resulted in the creation of Rapifax Company, which purchased a majority interest in Dacom and was responsible for marketing Dacom products. The Dacom 412 Secure Fax, the first digital sub-minute facsimile came to market shortly after and in 1973 was awarded the IR-100 Best Product of the Year award.

Also, in 1973 a majority interest in Rapifax was sold to Ricoh, a Japanese manufacturing company, which purchased the CBS holdings in the company. Dacom became a wholly owned subsidiary of Rapifax and its technology was transferred to the parent company. Savin retained a 23% in Rapifax, which was subsequently sold to Ricoh as well. Ricoh moved R&D and manufacturing to Japan, a move unsuccessfully contested by Dacom founders in court. Dacom technology was ultimately incorporated into the Ricoh brand fax machines.

Dacom, Inc. succeeded not only in developing breakthrough technology but successfully marketed high-end facsimile equipment in the 1970s for general business and special niche markets, including government agencies, military communications, and remote newspaper publishing. In the mid-1970s, the Rapifax 100 established itself as the market leader in the "ultrafast facsimile market".

== Patents Assigned to Dacom, Inc. ==
| Patent No. | Description | Inventors | Date granted |
|---|---|---|---|
| FR2053965; CA917571; US4135214 | A method and apparatus wherein novel adaptive encoding and decoding processes are utilized to reduce the quantity of symbols or descriptors required to transmit | Donald R. Weber | 4/16/1971; 12/26/1972; 1/16/1979 |
| US3868477 | Binary facsimile communication system employing an automatic contrast enhancement method | Howard Katzman | 2/25/1975 |
| GB1409365; US3916095; CA1002175-7 | Dual-line data compression method and system for compressing, transmitting and reproducing facsimile data | Donald R. Weber; Lou Joseph; Edward A. Poe; Ralph W. Austed | 10/81975; 10/28/1975; 12/21/1975 |
| US3965290 | Video-to-binary conversion apparatus for use in image reproduction systems and the like to convert an input video signal to an output binary signal… | James G. Tisue | 6/24/1976 |
| US4000368 | An electronic non-uniform clock generating apparatus including a modulo N counter for counting uniform clock pulses in a controlled manner to develop a series | James G. Tisue | 12/28/1976 |
| US 4084196 | An electronic half-tone generating circuit for enabling a black and white facsimile transmission system to accurately and efficiently transmit and reproduce images including shades… | James G. Tisue; Donald R. Weber; Peter A. Johanson | 4/11/1978 |
| US4107610 | A data handling system for converting an analog signal into binary form for storage or transmission to a remote receiver and subsequent reconstruction back… | Donald R. Weber | 8/15/1978 |
