= Fax demodulator =

A fax demodulator is a device used to intercept fax messages by listening in on a telephone line or radio signal.

== Function ==
A typical (Group III) fax transmission requires a two-way conversation between two modems (that is, each participant must both transmit and receive).

Each modem may be part of a “fax machine” incorporating an image scanner and a printer.

== Application ==
A demodulator can only be used to observe a conversation between two fax modems, usually to record the image transmitted.

It cannot be used to receive a fax transmission in the usual sense, because a sending modem cannot transmit an image without first negotiating a connection with a receiving modem.

== See also ==
- Alfa DiskFax
