= Adaptive compression =

Type of data compression

Adaptive compression is a type of data compression which changes compression algorithms based on the type of data being compressed.
