= Transmitting subscriber identification =

A transmitting subscriber identification (abbreviated TSID) is a string that identifies a specific fax machine as the sender of a fax transmission. The transmitting machine sends its TSID to the receiving machine. The receiving machine typically prints the TSID at the top or bottom of the received fax to help the recipient determine the fax's origin. See Called subscriber identification for further information.

== See also ==
- Caller ID
