= Engineered cellular magmatic =

Synthetic stone of glass and ceramic

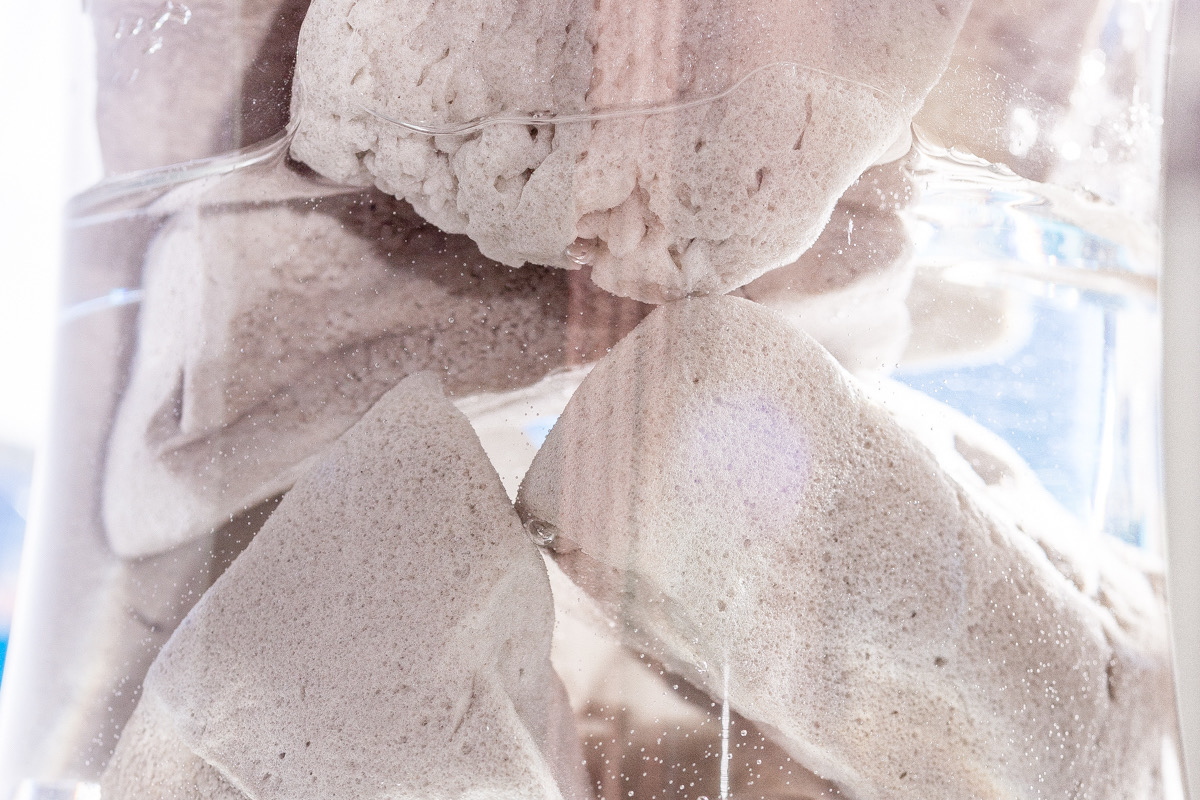
ECM bio-lattice for air filtration

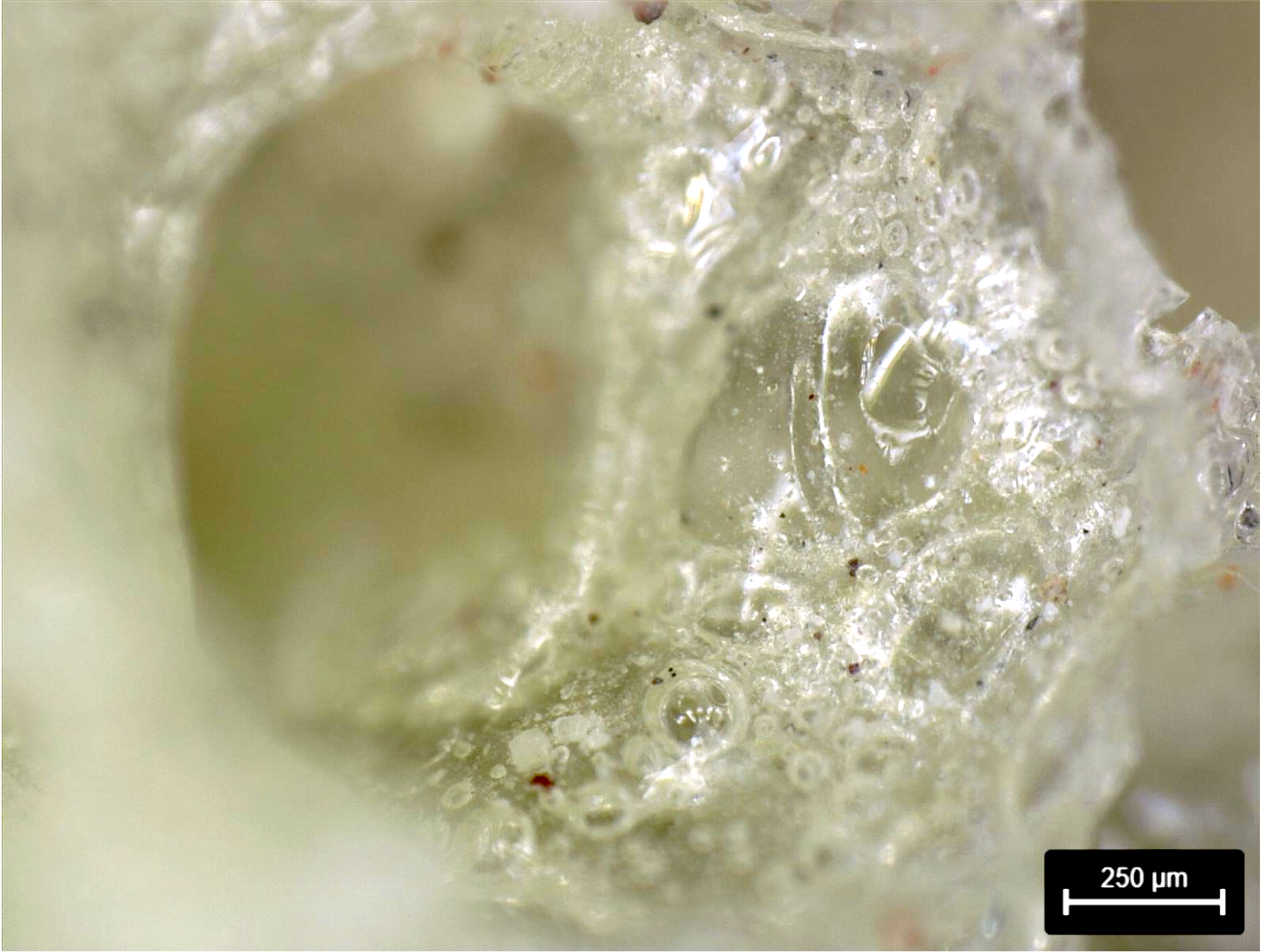
Microscopy of an ECM upcycled from waste glass.

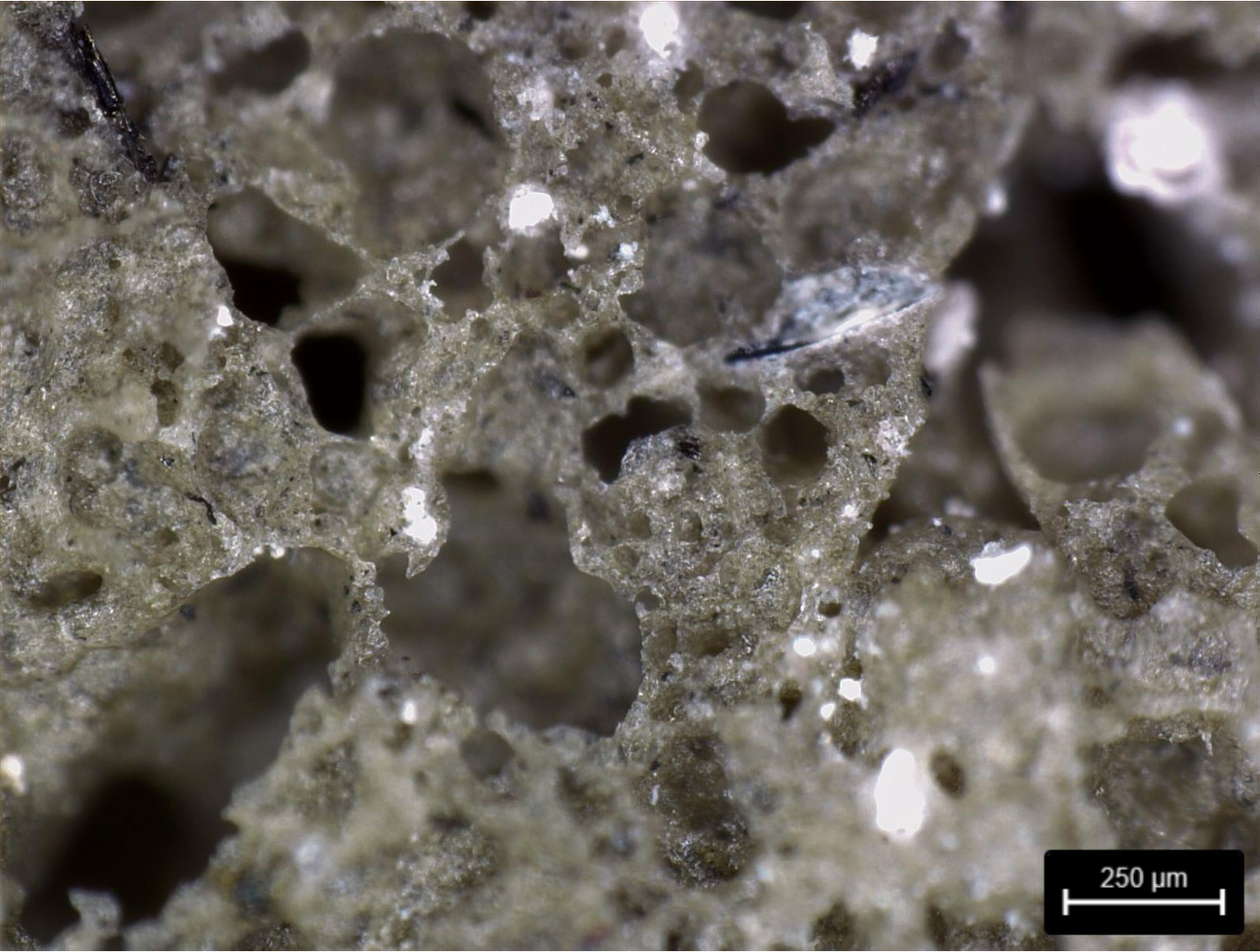
Microscopy of an ECM produced from municipal solid waste incinerator ash and carbon fiber waste.

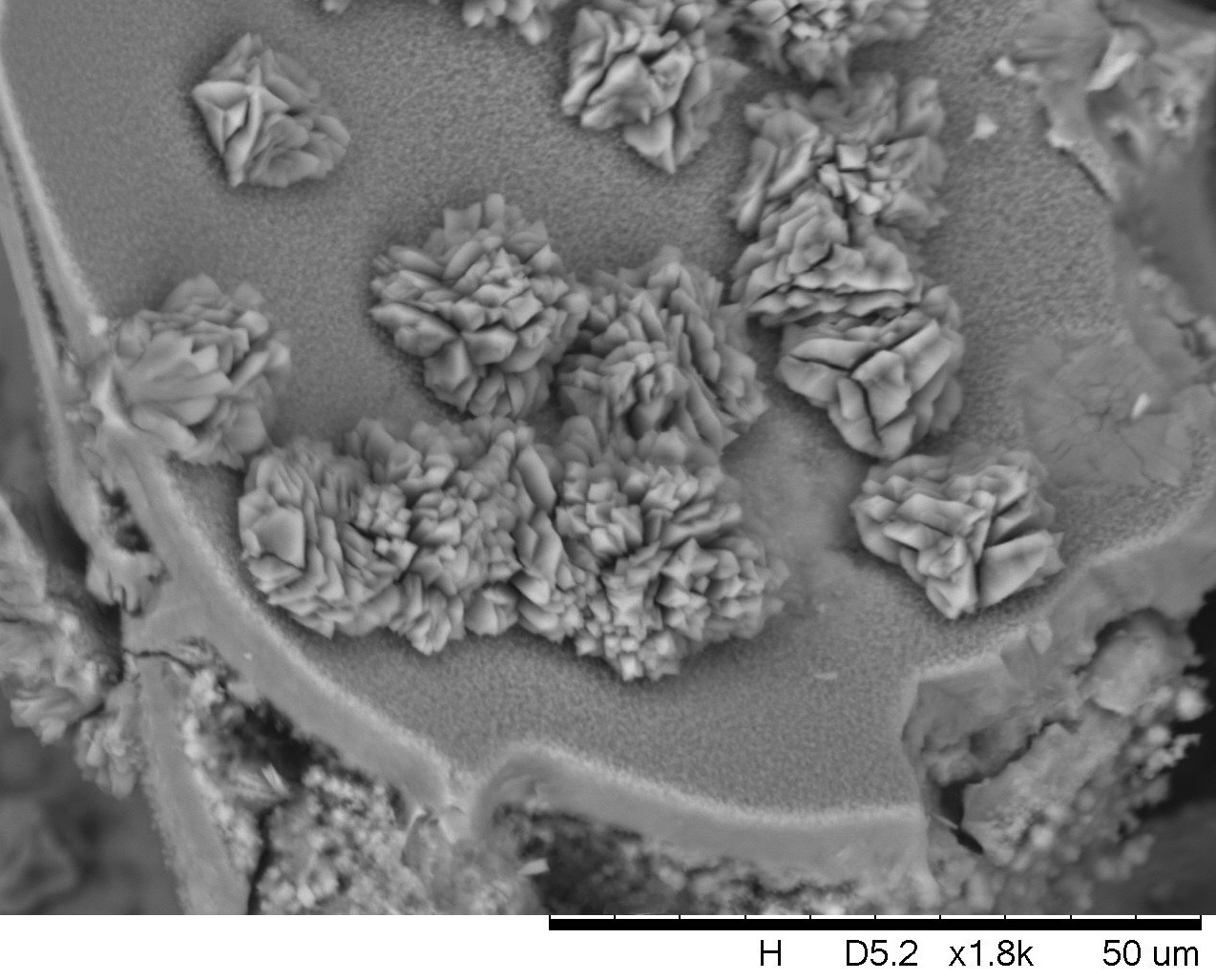
SEM image of zeolite crystals on the cell wall of an engineered cellular magmatic.

Engineered cellular magmatics (ECMs) are synthetic stone of glass and ceramic. ECMs replicate rare, naturally occurring volcanic materials, and exhibit useful structural and chemical properties of those materials. The US Department of Energy has recognized ECMs as an advanced material, funding further research into the manufacture and application of ECMs through ARPA-E and Savannah River National Laboratory.

== Properties ==
ECMs can be engineered to include a broad range of silicate species, with various reactivity. Their physical structure can range from closed to open cell, resembling pumice or porous ceramic. They can be composed of internal pore and vesicular structures with individual cross sections that can measure from millimeter down to nanometer scale. Open cell varieties exhibit extensive surface areas which amplify ion exchange capabilities (both cationic and anionic). These features make them well suited for various cement construction filtration and remediation applications. They typically contain both amorphous and crystalline structures.

== Application ==
Known uses for ECMs include air and water filtration, biological and chemical remediation, microbial habitat, soil and cementitious amendments. They can also be used in the manufacture of various forms of zeolite due to the resulting silicate lattice, and in various reactors for chemical separation. They meet and exceed the ASTM Standard Specification for Lightweight Aggregates for Structural Concrete, and exceed ASTM standards for vegetative green roof media.

== History ==
ECMs share a history with foam glass, but are engineered for specific chemical reactivity and structural properties not generally considered the domain of foam glass. The term engineered cellular magmatic was adopted to describe the material in late 2019 by inventor Robert Hust. Other named inventors include Gene Ramsey, Cory Trivelpiece, Gert Nielsen, and Philip Galland.

== Manufacture ==
ECMs can be manufactured from raw materials (minerals with high silica content) and a range of waste and recycled materials that, by their utilization, represent significant savings in both energy and carbon emissions. ECMs have been successfully created utilizing various waste streams, upcycling glass waste, municipal incinerator waste ash, carbon fiber waste, and wastes from various types of mining. The production process is similar to that of sintered foam glass or ceramics, consisting of 1) grinding the input materials to a powder, 2) firing the material at various levels of thermal exposure (500º - 2000 °C) as it 3) travels through a 36-meter (120 ft.) long furnace.

== See also ==
- Silicate
- Ceramic foam
- Foam glass
- High Performance Concrete
- Materials science
- Environmental technology
- Upcycling
