= Analog Expansion Bus =

The Analog Expansion Bus is a hardware bus that was designed by Dialogic for interfacing DTI/124, D/4x, AMX and other voice response component boards which fit in an AT-expansion slot of a personal computer.
