= Alfa DiskFax =

Digital telecommunications device

The Alfa DiskFax was a communication device created by Alfa Systems of the United Kingdom. It was launched in 1990. The DiskFax was designed to allow the transfer of digital files over a conventional telephone line to a remote DiskFax machine.

== Overview ==
In operation users would insert an PC-compatible floppy disc into the unit, at which point the data would be transmitted automatically to a receiver, which would write an image of the data on a local floppy disc. There were two models, one equipped with 5¼-inch, and 3½-inch drives, and a second with an internal hard drive for storing incoming data.

Encrypted versions of the DiskFax were sold to the military and intelligence markets. The DiskFax was also used by Britain's Conservative Party during the 1992 general election.

Alfa Systems was founded in 1985 by David Karlin, formerly of Sinclair Research.

== See also ==
- GammaFax
