= Fax server =

A fax server is a system installed in a local area network (LAN) server that allows computer users whose computers are attached to the LAN to send and receive fax messages.

Alternatively, the term fax server is sometimes used to describe a program that enables a computer to send and receive fax messages, set of software running on a server computer which is equipped with one or more fax-capable modems (or dedicated fax boards) attached to telephone lines or, more recently, software modem emulators which use T.38 ("Fax over IP") technology to transmit the signal over an IP network. Its function is to accept documents from users, convert them into faxes, and transmit them, as well as to receive fax calls and either store the incoming documents or pass them on to users. Users may communicate with the server in several ways, through either a local network or the Internet. In a big organization with heavy fax traffic, the computer hosting the fax server may be dedicated to that function, in which case the computer itself may also be known as a fax server.

== User interfaces ==
For outgoing faxes, several methods are available to the user:

- An e-mail message (with optional attachments) can be sent to a special e-mail address; the fax server monitoring that address converts all such messages into fax format and transmits them.
- The user can tell their computer to "print" a document using a "virtual printer" which, instead of producing a paper printout, sends the document to the fax server, which then transmits it.
- A web interface can be used, allowing files to be uploaded, and transmitted to the fax server for faxing.
- Special client software may be used.

For incoming faxes, several user interfaces may be available:

- The user may be sent an e-mail message for each fax received, with the pages included as attachments, typically in either TIFF or PDF format.
- Incoming faxes may be stored in a dedicated file directory, which the user can monitor.
- A website may allow users to log in and check for received faxes.
- Special client software may be used.

== Advantages over paper fax machines ==
Fax servers offer various advantages over traditional fax systems:

- Users can send and receive faxes without leaving their desks.
- Any printable computer file can be faxed, without having to first print the document on paper.
- Most of the problems on a fax server can be diagnosed and solved from remote locations.
- The number of fax lines in an organization can be reduced, as the server can queue the large numbers of faxes and send each when any of a number of lines is free.
- Faxing capability can be added easily to computer programs, allowing automatic generation of faxes.
- Transmitted faxes are more legible and professional-looking.
- There is less clutter of office equipment; incoming faxes can be printed on a standard computer printer.
- Printer jams on malfunctioning fax printers may be reprinted without being re-faxed.
- Faxing may be monitored and/or recorded, so that users may be allocated quotas or charged fees, or to ensure compliance with data-retention and financial laws.
- Fax servers can be located centrally in an organisation's data centres providing resilience and disaster recovery facilities to a traditionally desktop technology.
- Incoming junk faxes are not as much of a problem; the server may maintain a blacklist of numbers it will not accept faxes from (or a white list listing all the numbers it will accept calls from), and those that do get through do not waste paper or other printing resources, like ink or toner.
- Incoming faxes can be handled electronically as part of a paperless office scheme, reducing or eliminating paper use.

== Public fax services ==
There are many Internet fax providers operating fax servers as a commercial public service. Subscribers can interact with the servers using methods similar to those available for standard fax servers, and would be assigned a dedicated fax number for as long as they maintain their subscription. Fees are normally charged on a flat monthly rate, with a limit on the number of fax pages sent and/or received.

== Integrated fax programs ==
An integrated fax program is a complete set of faxing software which operates on a single computer which is equipped with a fax-capable modem connected to a telephone line. Its user interfaces may be similar to those used to communicate with fax servers, except that since the entire operation takes place on the user's computer the user may be made more aware of the progress of the transmission. Integrated fax programs are aimed at consumers and small organizations, and may sometimes be bundled with the computer's operating system.

== See also ==
- Internet fax
- Unified messaging
