= Toll-free telephone numbers in the North American Numbering Plan =

In the North American Numbering Plan (NANP), toll-free telephone numbers have the area code prefix 800, 833, 844, 855, 866, 877, or 888. Additionally, area codes 822, 880 through 887, and 889 are reserved for toll-free use in the future. 811 is excluded because it is a special dialing code in the group NXX for various other purposes.

Calls to the toll-free numbers are charged to the receiving party, and are free to the caller if dialed from land-line telephones, but may incur mobile airtime charges for cellular service.

== History ==
Most carriers in the United States and in all of Canada use flat-rate billing for local calls, which incur no per-call cost to residential subscribers. Long-distance calls have higher prices. As regulators in North America had long allowed long-distance calling to be priced artificially high in return for artificially low rates for local service, subscribers tended to make toll calls rarely and to keep them deliberately brief.

Some businesses, targeting to sell products to buyers outside the local calling area, were willing to accept collect calls or ordered a special service from the Local Exchange Company, such as Zenith or Commerce numbers, where the called party paid the cost of receiving telephone calls. Initially, all of these calls had to be completed by a telephone operator.

The first automated toll-free telephone numbers were assigned with area code 800, created as inbound Wide Area Telephone Service (InWATS) in 1966 (U.S. intrastate) and 1967 (interstate). These terminated on special fixed-rate trunks which would accept calls from a specified calling area with either no limit or a specific maximum number of hours per month. The billing of calls was not itemized and the expensive fixed-rate line was only within financial reach of large corporations and government agencies. Typically, a service provider offered a variety of zones, each costing more than the smaller ones, but adding progressively larger areas from which calls would be accepted for a customer.

In the early 1980s, Bell Labs received a patent for what became AT&T's "Advanced 800 Service", a computer-controlled system where any toll-free number could point to any destination number, such as to a small business local number instead of a special InWATS line, and an itemized bill generated only for the calls the business actually received. By breaking the link between the number's exchange prefix and geographic location, this system opened opportunities for vanity number advertising – an advantage in media like commercial radio where numbers need to be memorable.

Prior to the toll-free long distance market was opened to competition after 1986, a customer may have had a multi-carrier toll free number assigned by the Local Exchange Company for intrastate callers and an order placed with a long distance company for interstate callers. A RespOrg system was implemented in 1993 to provide toll-free number portability between rival carriers using the SMS/800 database. Open competition also brought an end to the pattern of long distance subsidizing local service, bringing per-minute charges down to levels where any business could afford to take orders using an 800-number.

Originally, 800 service in the US and 800 service in Canada were isolated from each other, but in 1984, an agreement between carriers in the two countries allowed the numbers in each country to be accessible to the other. Providers of 800 service were able to add zones to cover the expanded areas able to be offered. However, toll free numbers in the format of 800-NX2-XXXX may have been working for different customers in the US and Canada and not able to be extended beyond that country's border until the corresponding number became spare and assignable.

== Assignment ==
Toll-free telephone numbers in the NANP are regulated by the Code of Federal Regulations (CFR) Part 52 Section 101. RespOrgs assign the numbers in the SMS/800 database. This database is administered by the Number Administration and Service Center (NASC), a service contracted to a private entity by the Federal Communications Commission.

The SMS/800 database and RespOrg structure are used in the U.S. and Canada. A few specific exchanges remain reserved or are assigned to specific North American Numbering Plan countries which do not draw numbers from the SMS/800 pool:

- Some 800-NXX prefixes are reserved for the following areas:
  - 800-389 for the Bahamas
  - 800-534 for Barbados
  - 800-623 for Bermuda
  - 800-415, 800-751, and 800-907 for the Dominican Republic
  - 800-271 for Trinidad
  - 800-855 is reserved for services for deaf or hearing-impaired users; these TTY-related numbers, operated by individual telephone companies, are assigned directly by the North American Numbering Plan Administrator (NANPA)
- Several other prefixes, including 800-484, 800-703, 800-744, and 800-904 are reserved by the FCC.
- The short code 911 is a reserved code used as an emergency telephone number and not available for use as an area code.
- The sequence 555 is reserved in every toll-free area code (except 800) for future information or directory assistance applications

== Operation ==
The first toll-free area code, 800, operated for over thirty years before its 7.8 million possible numbers were depleted, but new toll-free area codes are being depleted at an increasing rate both by more widespread use of the numbers by voice-over-IP, pocket pagers, residential, and small business use, and response tracking for individual advertisements (each ad from each client gets a different freephone number) or sale, lease or shared use.

These toll-free numbers can be called from any telephone in the NANP, but the owner (and sometimes the provider) can put restrictions on their use. Sometimes they accept calls only from a specific region. Some are not accessible from pay phones. Calls from pay phones assess the toll-free owner an additional fee in the U.S., as mandated by the FCC. Although toll-free numbers are not accessible outside the NANP, many international telephone services route calls through the U.S. via dial-in portals.

=== Operator handling ===
In the United States, both interexchange carriers (IXCs) such as Sprint, AT&T Inc., and Verizon, and Local Exchange Carriers (LECs) such as Verizon and AT&T offer toll-free services. The way that a toll-free number is handled depends on whether it is a domestic or an interexchange call. Most countries are divided into regions called exchanges, and within each exchange a local telephone company handles all phone services. Intraexchange calls, which do not leave the individual region, would be managed by the individual local telephone company. Calls that cross U.S. LATA boundaries, or originate in one country and terminate in another, are referred to as inter-exchange calls.

The format of the toll-free number is called a non-geographic number, in contrast to telephone numbers associated with households that are geographic. (Since the advent of cell phones and voice over IP, households can have any area code in the U.S., but it is still geographic in the sense that calls from that area code are considered local, but the recipient can be physically anywhere). In the latter case, it is possible to determine an approximate location of the caller from the area code (e.g. New York or London). In contrast, toll-free numbers could be physically located anywhere in the world.

When a toll-free number is dialed, the telephone company determines where the actual physical destination is, which is achieved by using the intelligent network capabilities embedded into the network. In the simplest case, the toll-free number is translated into a regular geographic number, which is then routed by the telephone exchange in the normal way. More complicated cases may apply special routing rules in addition such as Time of Day routing.

Toll-free numbers are normally specific to each country. Canadian numbers are an exception as they are drawn from the same SMS / 800 pool as other North American Numbering Plan countries; the +800 Universal International Freephone Number is an exception as these work from multiple country codes. The arbitrary distinctions between Local Exchange Carrier / Interexchange carrier, intrastate / interstate and the LATA structure are artificial U.S. regulatory constructs which do not have direct parallels in Canada or any other nation.

=== Routing in the U.S. ===
The IXCs generally handle traffic crossing local access and transport area (LATA) boundaries. A LATA is a geographical area within the U.S. that delineates boundaries of the LEC. LECs can provide local transport within LATAs. When a customer decides to use toll-free service, they assign a Responsible Organization (RespOrg) to own and maintain that number. The RespOrg can be either the IXC that is going to deliver the majority of the toll-free services or an independent RespOrg.

When a toll-free number is dialed, each digit is analyzed and processed by the LEC. The toll-free call is identified as such by the service switching point (SSP). The SSP is responsible for sending call information to the service control point (SCP), routing the request through at least one signal transfer point (STP) in the Signalling System 7 (SS7) network. SS7 is a digital out-of-band method of transmitting signalling (call control) information in the Public Switched Telephone Network (PSTN). The SS7 network is a packet-switched network carrying signaling data (setup and tear down of the call and services) separate from the circuit-switched bearer network (the payload of the telephone call) in the AIN services network. The SSP asks the SCP where to send the call.

The LEC will determine to which IXC that number is assigned, based on the customer's choice. Toll-free numbers can be shared among IXCs. A customer may do this for disaster recovery or so they can negotiate a better price. For example, a customer may assign 50% of their traffic to Sprint and 50% to AT&T.

Once the LEC determines to which IXC to send the call, it is sent to the IXCs point of presence (POP). The IXCs SCP must now determine where to send the call. Once the final determination of where the call is supposed to go is completed, the call is then routed to the subscriber's trunk lines. In a call center or contact center environment, the call is then typically answered by a telephone system known as an automatic call distributor (ACD) or private branch exchange (PBX).

The subsequent routing of the call may be done in many ways, ranging from simple to complex depending on the needs of the owner of the toll-free number. Some of the available options are:

Time-of-Day (TOD) routing
An example of using TOD routing would be a company with a call center on the east coast and a call center on the west coast. TOD routing would enable Follow the Sun routing. The east coast center opens first and calls are sent to that destination earlier in the day. As the time changes across the country, expanded coverage would be offered by the call center in the west.

Day of Week (DOW) or Day of Year (DOY) routing
Depending on the day of the week and business practices, not all call centers operate 24×7. Some centers may be closed for weekends or holidays. DOW routing allows alternate routing for calls that arrive on specific days. DOY routing allows for alternate routing on fixed holidays (example December 25).

Area Code or Exchange routing
Toll-free traffic may also be routed depending upon the location of the caller. For instance, if a company has call centers in the north and in the south, they may express a preference to have their southern callers speak with people in the southern call centers. Companies may also wish to take advantage of the difference in interstate rates versus intrastate rates. For example, the cost of a telephone call across multiple states may be less expensive than a call within a state, and as a result, the ability to route a call originating in Michigan to a call center outside Michigan can save a company substantial amounts of money.

Least-Cost routing
Least-Cost routing is a variant of area code / exchange routing in which an independent RespOrg sends calls via different carriers based on which is least expensive for any given origination point. The RespOrg is not the carrier. A Canadian carrier could be used for Canadian calls and a U.S. carrier for American calls; a user with many inbound local voice over IP numbers in multiple cities could convert toll-free calls on one main toll-free number to local calls in each city where it has a point of presence.

Percentage Allocation routing
If a company has multiple call centers, the company can choose to route calls across a number of call centers on a percentage basis. For example, an airline with ten call centers may choose to allocate 10% of all incoming traffic to each center.

All-Trunks-Busy routing
If at a given time a company's trunk facilities can no longer handle the incoming traffic, an alternate destination may be chosen. This assists companies handling unexpected call volumes or during crisis times.
Ring No Answer Routing
Some carriers have the ability to pull a call back into the network if the call is not answered. This provides for contingency routing for calls that ring and are not answered at the final destination.

Emergency or Disaster routing
Companies usually have some type of disaster plan to deal with both natural (e.g. floods, fires and earthquakes) and man-made (e.g. bomb threats) emergencies. IXCs can provide alternate destinations should any of these situations occur.

Take Back and Transfer / Transfer Connect / Agent Redirect
If a company uses an ACD to facilitate the transfer, the ACD will remain in the call as long as the parties are on the phone. The drawback is that this uses up trunk capacity on the ACD (or VRU). This is called by a number of names including hair-pinning or tromboning. IXCs have the capability to allow a company to answer a call, provide a level of service, and then transfer the call to another location. These IXC features provide a level of transferring that is different from what is available via the ACD. There is usually a feature charge associated with this offering.

All of the above routing features are sometimes referred to as static routing features. These routes are put in place and are not usually changed. If changes are required, a customer usually has several options to make changes. A customer can call the IXC or an independent RespOrg directly via a special toll-free number to make changes, or a customer may be able to make changes through direct access to the network via a dedicated terminal provided by the IXC.

== Legacy toll-free access codes 880, 881, and 882 ==
From 1996 to 2004, the area codes 880 and 881, as well as 882 starting in 1998, were used as special telephone area codes for the provisioning of international inbound foreign-billed 800-type toll-free services.

The service enabled callers in a NANP country to access toll-free telephone numbers in another NANP country. The caller dialed 880 followed by the seven-digit toll-free 800-number. The caller was billed for the international call to the destination country, while the receiver paid the domestic call leg.

Use of this set of area codes was discontinued effective April 1, 2004, when the area codes were returned to the pool of unassigned future toll-free area codes.

== See also ==
- List of North American Numbering Plan area codes
