= Telephone number pooling =

Method of reallocating telephone numbers

Telephone number pooling, thousands-block number pooling, or just number pooling, is a method of allocating telephony numbering space of the North American Numbering Plan in the United States. The method allocates telephone numbers in blocks of 1,000 consecutive numbers of a given central office code to telephony service providers. In the United States it replaced the practice of allocating all 10,000 numbers of a central office prefix at a time. Under number pooling, the entire prefix is assigned to a rate center, to be shared among all providers delivering services in that rate center. Number pooling reduced the quantity of unused telephone numbers in markets which have been fragmented between multiple service providers, avoided central office prefix exhaustion in high growth areas, and extended the lifetime of the North American telephone numbering plan without structure changes of telephone numbers. Telephone number pooling was first tested for area code 847 in Illinois in June 1998, and became national policy in a series of Federal Communications Commission (FCC) orders from 2000 to 2003.

== History ==
The North American Numbering Plan is a closed numbering plan, meaning that it assigns telephone numbers to individual endpoints based on a fixed-length telephone number. The national telephone number consists of a three-digit area code, a three-digit central office code, and a four-digit line number. Thus, each central office provides a resource of 10,000 telephone lines with a unique number each. While often enough for small communities, most cities require multiple central offices to service the community.

In the North American Numbering Plan, mobile telephones do not use distinct area codes from wireline services, but many central offices provide only wireless services, or just wireline services.

After the breakup of the Bell System on January 1, 1984, most telephone service areas in the United States were dominated by one carrier which held a monopoly on local service. The landline telephone systems evolved over a period of over one hundred years before diversification, so that it was technically difficult to share infrastructure between multiple providers. Central offices were established based on local demand and convention, and dialing prefixes were assigned to single providers who managed the plant in each location. This allocated all ten thousand line numbers of the central office code to one provider, even when demand could not exhaust the numbering pool. A new, competitive provider for the same area would be assigned the entire number space of a new central office prefix, reducing the overall efficiency of number utilization in the area.

Widespread introduction of the Advanced Mobile Phone System (AMPS) mobile phone service in 1983 created two competing carriers in each service area. Additional mobile carriers entered the market to provide digital service (such as GSM, introduced in 1991). In 1985, competitive access providers (CAPs) began to offer private line and special access services; originally based on private branch exchange (PBX) standards such as direct inward dial, these evolved into competitive local exchange carriers (CLEC). The Telecommunications Act of 1996 required incumbent telephone companies (ILECs) to interconnect with the new entrants.

Deployment of cable modems and voice over IP in the 1990s further blurred the boundaries between telcos and cable television providers. Every broadband Internet provider could become a telephone company, with telephony merely being one more application running over the packet-switched network. There was no requirement that the Internet to telephony gateway be operated by a facilities-based telco or cable company; anyone could buy a large block of telephone numbers from a CLEC, deploy a server to feed the calls to broadband Internet and offer telephone service.

With the advent of competition, each individual carrier required its own prefixes in each rate center, depleting available prefixes within high-growth and high-competition areas. Many of these new prefixes were sparsely used. This led to a rapid increase in the introduction of new area codes.

=== Testing and deployment ===
Public resistance to the introduction of new area codes, whether as overlay complexes (which allowed customers to keep their existing numbers, but broke seven-digit local calling) or by area code splits (where the area code of existing numbers was changed), prompted the FCC and state commissions to introduce thousands-block number pooling, i.e. the allocation of number space in blocks of only 1,000 numbers (area code and one digit of line number), rather than of an entire central office prefix with 10,000 lines.

These developments largely coincided with the deployment of local number portability (LNP), a technology that allowed subscribers to keep their existing telephone numbers when switching to a different provider in the same community. The original LNP database contract was granted in 1996.

Telephone number pooling relies on LNP as it relies on carriers to return blocks of mostly unused numbers. The thousand-number blocks being returned to the pool may be "contaminated" with up to a hundred working numbers which must be ported to a block which the carrier intends to keep.

In 1998, the North American Numbering Plan Administration estimated that the NANP would have run out of area codes for 10-digit telephone numbers by 2025 at then-current rates of depletion.

An initial number pooling trial was conducted in area code 847 in Illinois in April 1998. Nortel had implemented support for thousands-level routing of calls in its equipment by 1999. Pooling trials were conducted in 34 area codes across a dozen US states between 1997 and 2000.

Area code 847, located northwest of Chicago, had already been subjected to multiple area code splits and a proposed overlay area code 224 with 10-digit local calling was drawing public backlash; inefficient allocation meant that some providers had been holding 10,000 number blocks in rate centers where they had few or no clients. A carrier with a few thousand clients scattered across multiple rate centers often had 50,000 allocated numbers. The state's telecommunications regulator, the Illinois Commerce Commission, at the urging of consumer advocates, pushed back against industry and FCC demands for a distributed overlay for 847 from 1999 to 2001 as half of the existing 847-numbers were not in use. The Citizens Utility Board, a Chicago-based consumer group, attempted to litigate against an FCC requirement that calls within the same area code be dialed with the area code when 224 was introduced in 2002. A similar fight by New York state's Public Service Commission to maintain seven-digit dialing within the same area code (including calls within 212) was also unsuccessful.

An attempt by the United States Telecom Association, a trade group of local telephone companies, to propose mandatory ten-digit dialing nationwide was rejected by the FCC in 2000. The FCC instead adopted many aspects of the Illinois Commerce Commission number pooling trial, including a requirement that telcos actually use 60% percent of their allocations (increased to 75% after three years) before requesting more phone numbers, allocation of new numbers to phone companies in blocks of 1,000 and a requirement that phone companies return unused numbers to a pool.

Number pooling was implemented in various areas (including Spokane in January 2002) with national rollout in the 100 largest metropolitan statistical areas (MSAs) on March 15, 2002.

While mandatory number pooling requirements originally existed only in the top 100 MSA's, the National Association of Regulatory Commissioners (NARUC) petitioned the FCC in 2006 to extend them to rural states to cope with demand for numbers for VoIP. All US states have implemented their own regulations requiring that carriers implement number pooling. By 2013, even sparsely populated Montana was using number pooling in order to extend the useful life of area code 406, the one area code in the state.

In some areas, decreased code demand and conservation efforts have allowed the introduction of proposed new area codes to be delayed. Area code 564, proposed to overlay the portion of western Washington State currently in area codes 206, 253, 360, and 425 was delayed in 2001 as codes were reclaimed and numbers pooled; it was later reinstated, initially affecting area code 360 and expanding to the other mentioned area codes as needed, with 10-digit dialing mandatory as of September 30, 2017. A proposed area code 445 overlaying Philadelphia was scrapped in 2003; it was later reinstated, and went into effect on March 3, 2018. An area code 582 intended to split Pennsylvania's existing area code 814 was abandoned in 2012. A plan which would have implemented a concentrated overlay in 2002 in the greater Hampton Roads area, Virginia area code 757, was scrapped after number pooling was implemented, and it was not until 2022 that area code 948 was introduced as an all-services overlay area code.

Number pooling remains available to carriers on an optional basis in many US markets in which it is not yet mandatory.

Thousands-block number pooling is just one of several approaches for conserving numbering resources. Other options include consolidating multiple rate centers into one–as much of the problem is caused by carriers needlessly requesting a prefix in each rate center–allowing carriers to use a single prefix in each LATA or local interconnect region to port existing numbers from all rate centers in that area, or even placing all the unused numbers in one rate center into a single available pool from which carriers port only what they–as already exists for toll-free telephone numbers with the SMS/800 database and RespOrg structure. A block of 1,000 numbers per carrier, like the earlier allocation of 10,000 numbers per carrier in each rate center, is arbitrary. Local number portability permits telephone numbers to be assigned to carriers one at a time.

== Implementation ==
In areas which were running short of numbers, blocks of 10,000 numbers would be assigned to an individual rate center; from there, it would be split into smaller blocks of 1,000 numbers each, for assignment to individual providers by a number pooling administrator.

According to 47 CFR 52.20, a US federal regulation administered by the Federal Communications Commission:

- Thousands-block number pooling is a process by which the 10,000 numbers in a central office code (NXX) are separated into ten sequential blocks of 1,000 numbers each (thousands-blocks), and allocated separately within a rate center.
- In area codes where service providers are required to participate in thousands-block number pooling, the carrier is to return any blocks of 1,000 numbers which are more than 90% empty; an exemption applies for one block per rate center which the carrier must keep as an initial block or footprint block.
- The Pooling Administrator, a neutral third party, maintains no more than a six-month inventory of telephone numbers in each thousands-block number pool.

The default National Number Pool Administration in the United States is Somos, the North American Numbering Plan Administrator. In 2024, Canada was ordered by the Canadian Radio-television and Telecommunications Commission to implement number pooling, and began implementing it in 2026.

Local exchange routing databases now include a "block ID" to indicate the ownership of the specific sub-blocks within a prefix.

An example of a small hamlet with number pooling is La Fargeville, New York (population 600), in the 315/680 area codes. Once a small incorporated village built around a saw mill, its town hall closed in 1922. The La Fargeville rate center's local calling area is the same as neighboring Clayton, New York, yet there is a separate Verizon landline exchange for each village — likely as a historical artifact of an earlier era when telcos built many small, local stations. While both villages are served by separate, unattended remote switching centers controlled from Watertown, Verizon nominally has a half-dozen competitors offering local numbers in tiny La Fargeville:

315-658-0	Voxbeam Telecommunications
315-658-1; 315-658-6	Level 3 Communications
315-658-2; 315-658-4	Verizon Communications
315-658-3	Inteliquent (formerly Onvoy)
315-658-5	Broadview Networks
315-658-7	Bandwidth.com
315-658-8; 315-658-9	Spectrum

Ten thousand telephone numbers for a hamlet of 600 people is inefficient, but the actual result, were number pooling not available, would be seven times worse; each telephone company would be assigned an entire 10,000-number telephone exchange code for a total of 70,000 numbers. Repeating this method in the entire numbering plan area for each municipality would quickly exhaust the number of central office codes of the NPA.

== See also ==
- Numbering plan area
