= Teledotcom =

A teledotcom is a domain name that not only spells a memorable word but also has a matching toll-free telephone number. This means the word that spells something will have a toll-free prefix and a top level domain extension after it. A teledotcom can be accessible by either phone or internet address.

Most owners of a toll-free number that spells something (see Phoneword), will also try to register the matching domain name and therefore create a teledotcom; a valuable asset should they wish to sell it. It is significantly more difficult for an owner of a valuable domain names, because the matching toll-free numbers are much rarer. As a consequence of the difficulties in obtaining the domain name and the matching toll-free telephone number, the number of teledotcoms is quite low.

== Marketing ==
An example teledotcom is 1-800-Flowers.com. Customers can either visit the website or telephone 1-800-FLOWERS (1-800-356-9377). Others examples are 1-800-Mattress.com and 1-800 Contacts.com. To extend their marketing reach, these companies will also advertise on television across the United States.

Buyer Jim McCann stated that 1-800-flowers purchased the toll free number from a flower company that was seven million dollars in debt. The toll-free numbers are considered so valuable to the company that the company now owns the same number under the 888, and 877 prefix. When the 866 toll free prefix was launched, competition for the flowers number was stiff, with 1-800-flowers eventually losing to a rival company.

Unlike domain names where one person can own eLoans, and another can own eLoan and all can be allowed to use the names as they are considered fair use, toll-free numbers that are first to market and part of a brand, are usually protected. For example, when a New York-based business tried to set up 1-718-Mattress, it was forced to relinquish the use of the number as it confused people by too closely copying the brand of 1-800-Mattress.

== Using a toll-free number as a brand ==
All companies do not use their web domain names as their brand. Not every company would name themselves after the domain they acquire as they often take a similar but not exact name.

However, when a domain name or telephone number spell a valued term, the company will not only use the Toll free, Domain or combination Teledotcom as a brand, they will sometimes even change a long-standing company name to match it. This has happened with lenders for instance, Refinance.com now has that as their name when previously they were another company prior to acquiring the valuable domain name worth seven figures.

Using a toll free or teledotcom as a brand is common when they spell a frequently used or understood term.

When a company acquires a similar area code to a predecessor such as 1866flowers, it should not name itself as a company, 1866flowers.com etc. It can however fully utilize and publish the number and its spelling for easy remembering for its customers as long as it makes clear that it is part of separate company. The 1-800-Flowers company cannot prohibit the 1866Flowers phone number from use or marketing of the easily remembered phone number when used in conjunction with a distinguishable brand name.

The mistake made by 1-718-Mattress is they did not distinguish themselves as a company with another name. Had they been Neighborhood Mattress Inc., with 718-Mattress published alongside, then 1-800 Mattress could not have had a claim that 1-718 was using a confusingly similar name. The use of a phone number and its spelling is a right for any holder of a toll free or other prefix. Telephone numbers are part of a public trust and must be fairly available to anyone on an equal basis. Responsible Organizations (RespOrgs) must honor the rules that distribute phone numbers fairly according to law.

== Consumer Use of Teledotcoms ==
Consumers enjoy the easy access to services and goods that can be found by simply typing in the word on the keyboard such as flowers, or by simply dialing it.

1-800-Mattress is one such example. Consumers can order mattresses by calling or visiting on the web. Even with the 1-800-Mattress.com being a large purchase for the company, the convenience of telephone ordering from a toll free number that also spells the domain generally will increase business.
