= Toll-free number portability =

Toll-free number portability (Canada, US, New Zealand) or freephone number portability (Australia, UK) allows the subscriber of a freephone number to switch providers while retaining the same number for incoming calls. Similar schemes exist in many countries for local number portability and mobile number portability, although implementation details for each portability scheme varies between countries.

== Australia ==
ACA fixed a November 2000 implementation date for the provision of local rate and freephone number portability. The industry established a body, Industry Number Management Services (INMS) Ltd, to allocate individual numbers and administer the centralised reference database of all allocated local rate and freephone numbers.

Vanity numbers, such as phonewords or short 13- series shared-cost service numbers, are made available by auction.

== Europe and UK ==
United Kingdom numbers in the 0800 range (BT Freefone) first became portable in June 1997. Previously, rival carriers used differing area codes, 0800 for BT Freefone and 0500 for Cable & Wireless Freecall numbers.

Germany, Netherlands, Sweden and Belgium also introduced portability schemes in the late 1990s.

== North America ==
Wide Area Telephone Service (WATS) was introduced in the United States on January 15, 1961. Customers paid a flat-rate monthly service fee for large-volume interstate long-distance over a wide area. The inbound service was denoted as InWATS service.

Each exchange prefix in area code 800 was assigned to a specific carrier in a specific region (for example, 800-387 was Bell Canada in Toronto) and the numbers were brought to subscribers (usually large companies or governmental organisations) on special fixed-rate inbound trunks.

The system was redesigned in 1981 to use a database, the SMS/800 service management system, which could direct any toll-free number to any destination based on various conditions; number prefixes remained tied to specific carriers until a RespOrg (responsible organization) structure was introduced in 1993 (US) and 1994 (Canada) to allow subscribers to change providers by providing a Letter of Authorization (LOA) on company letterhead to their new provider authorizing a number to be moved.

== New Zealand ==
TNAS Limited, a joint venture company owned by Telecom and Vodafone, operates the Toll Free Number Portability system. The TNAS System is a database for co-ordination of allocation and porting of toll-free numbers and is used by nine carriers. A client may switch service providers, or a service provider switch host carriers, without a change in the published toll-free number.

== See also ==
- Local number portability
- Mobile number portability
- Rufnummernportierung (in German)
