= 0800 Reverse =

Discontinued UK Phone Service

0800 Reverse was a reverse charge (collect) call service that provided reverse charge calls within the United Kingdom. The service was operated by Reverse Corp Ltd. An 0800 Reverse charge call was placed by dialling the phoneword 0800 REVERSE (i.e. 0800 7383773). The number can be dialled as a free call from most out-of-credit mobile phones, and most fixed land lines. 0800 Reverse was advertised in television campaigns featuring Holly Valance, and the service was advertised on many phone boxes throughout the United Kingdom. The service is mainly targeted towards children and teenagers, but can be used by anyone.

Both 0800 Reverse and the number's sibling, MUMDAD (686323, 0800 686323 and 08000686323) that functions the same, have discontinued service.

Although none of the service's numbers are active, the 0800 Reverse website is still online.

== Complaints ==
In 2007, a complaint was raised with the Advertising Standards Authority (ASA), that the terms and conditions of the 0800 Reverse service were not made sufficiently apparent in their television advertisements. The ASA decided that the cost was likely to influence a viewer's decision to use the service and a recipient's decision whether to accept a call. They found that the call charge information was not sufficiently legible for it to be easily absorbed by viewers in one viewing, and ordered that the onscreen text regarding pricing be made more prominent.

The service was also the subject of a Watchdog investigation due to its high charges, and failure to inform users of its cost.
