= James McCann (businessman) =

American entrepreneur

James Francis McCann
- Education: John Jay College (graduated in 1974)
- Occupation: Businessman
- Years active: 1970s - present
- Known for: 1-800 Flowers
- Notable work: "Stop and Sell the Roses"; "A Year Full of Flowers"
- Spouse: Marylou
- Children: 3

James F. "Jim" McCann is an American entrepreneur who founded 1-800-Flowers, a corporation based in Long Island, New York; 1-800 Flowers was one of the first companies to pioneer and popularize the use of both toll-free telephone numbers and Web sites to sell goods and services directly to consumers.

== Biography ==
As a child, McCann grew up in Ozone Park, Queens, and is the oldest of five siblings in an Irish-American family; McCann is a third-generation American. For college, McCann attended the John Jay College of Criminal Justice in Manhattan, and graduated in 1974 with a bachelor's degree in psychology.

McCann first entered the flower business in the 1970s, when he purchased flower shops in New York City. He had previously worked as a social worker and as a part-time bartender in the Queens and Manhattan, respectively.

According to his autobiography, "Stop and Sell the Roses", he came up with the idea of building a nationwide flower service while "listening to the radio as he was shaving". In 1986, he bought a nearly bankrupt company in Texas which owned the phone number 1-800-Flowers. McCann changed the name of his chain accordingly.

In 1992 and 1994, McCann established deals with online pioneers CompuServe and AOL, making his company one of the first retailers to establish an online presence. In 1995, McCann established the website www.1800flowers.com, becoming one of the first retailers to establish a web presence. The company went public when it filed its IPO in 1999 under stock ticker FLWS.

As of 2016, McCann stepped down as chief executive officer of 1-800-Flowers in favor of his brother Christopher G. McCann. McCann owns 40% of the company.

McCann serves as a director for Winthrop-University Hospital, a trustee for Hofstra University, a trustee for the Cancer Research Institute, Inc. and Children's Progress Inc. He is often sought after to speak on topics of entrepreneurship, marketing and the Internet. He also serves on various corporate boards.

=== Personal life ===
McCann lives in the Philip L. Becker House in Flower Hill, New York, with his wife, Marylou, and three children. Additionally, he is a minority owner of the New York Mets, holding a 4% stake in the baseball team.

== Published works ==
- "Stop and Sell the Roses" - An autobiography written by McCann in 1998.
- "A Year Full of Flowers" - A book co-authored by McCann and his sister, Julie Mulligan, in 2004.
- "Lodestar" - Tapping Into the 10 Timeless Pillars to Success.
