= Iconectiv =

American communications services provider

Coordinates: 40°35′13″N 74°37′33″W

iconectiv
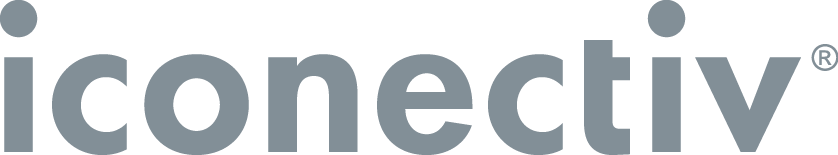
- Formerly: Central Services Organization, Inc. (1983); Bell Communications Research, Inc. (1984–1999)
- Type: Subsidiary
- Industry: Telecom Research
- Predecessor: Bell Telephone Laboratories
- Founded: October 1983; 42 years ago
- Headquarters: Bridgewater, New Jersey, U.S.
- Key people: Kathy Timko (CEO)
- Products: Industry Registries
- Owners: Koch Equity (2025-present); Ericsson (2012–25); Francisco Partners (16.7%, 2017–25)
- Number of employees: 500+ (2017)
- Website: iconectiv.com

iconectiv, LLC. is an American telecommunications and IT service management company headquartered in Bridgewater, New Jersey. In 2025, the company was sold to Koch Equity Development LLC.

== Overview ==
Known as Bellcore after its establishment in the United States in 1983 as part of the break-up of the Bell System, the company's name changed to Telcordia Technologies after a change of ownership in 1996. The business was acquired by Ericsson in 2012, then restructured and rebranded as iconectiv in 2013.

A major architect of the United States telecommunications system, it pioneered many services, including caller ID, call waiting, mobile number portability, and toll-free telephone (800) service. iconectiv also pioneered the prepaid charging system and the Intelligent Network.

The firm provides numbering services in more than a dozen countries, including serving as the Local Number Portability Administrator (LNPA) for the United States. In that capacity, it manages the Number Portability Administration Center (NPAC), the system that supports the implementation of local number portability.

== History ==
=== Founding ===
iconectiv was established on October 20, 1983, as Central Services Organization as part of the 1982 Modification of Final Judgment that broke up the Bell System. It later received the name Bell Communications Research. Nicknamed Bellcore, it was a consortium established by the Regional Holding Companies upon their separation from AT&T. Since AT&T retained Bell Laboratories, the operating companies desired a separate research and development facility. Bellcore, the tenth company to register an Internet domain name in comTLD, provided joint research and development, was involved in standards setting, training, and centralized government point-of-contact functions for its co-owners, the seven Regional Holding Companies that were themselves divested from AT&T as holding companies for the 22 local Bell Operating Companies.

Bellcore's initial staff and corporate culture were drawn from the nearby Bell Laboratories locations in northern New Jersey, plus additional staff from AT&T and regional operating companies. The company originally had its headquarters in Livingston with dedication by New Jersey Governor Thomas Kean in 1985, but moved its headquarters to Morristown a decade later. Bellcore also operated the former Bell System Center for Technical Education in Lisle, Illinois.

=== Separation from the Baby Bells ===
In 1996, the company was provisionally acquired by Science Applications International Corporation (SAIC). The sale was closed one year later, following a regulatory approval process that covered every U.S. state individually. Since the divested company no longer had any ownership connection with the Regional Bell Operating Companies (Baby Bells), the name was changed to Telcordia Technologies in 1999. The headquarters was moved to Piscataway, New Jersey.

The former headquarters campus in Morristown and its offices and laboratories in Red Bank, New Jersey, are former Bell Labs locations that were transferred to Telcordia.

Equal stakes in the company were sold in March 2005 to Providence Equity Partners and Warburg Pincus.

=== Acquisition by Ericsson ===
On June 14, 2011, Ericsson announced an agreement to acquire Telcordia for $1.15 billion. On January 12, 2012, Telcordia became a wholly owned subsidiary of Ericsson. On June 15, 2011, Ericsson announced the completion of the purchase from private-equity firms Providence Equity Partners and Warburg Pincus, with the goal to pursue industry trends that include mobile broadband, managed services/outsourcing and global OSS/BSS transformation. The acquisition, which officially closed on January 12, 2012, added about 2,600 employees to Ericsson's staff. On June 4, 2012, Telcordia and its products were officially rebranded as Ericsson.

In the process of integration, Telcordia's Advanced Technology Solutions business unit, the company's research arm, was rebranded as Applied Communication Sciences, and became a wholly owned subsidiary of Ericsson that operated independently on day-to-day operations pursuant to a proxy structure mandated by the U.S. government.

In February 2013, Ericsson launched iconectiv for its interconnection business. During this time, Ericsson maintained its corporate presence in Plano, Texas and iconectiv's corporate presence in New Jersey. In July 2017, iconectiv moved its headquarters from Piscataway to Bridgewater, New Jersey.

In August 2024, Ericsson announced a sale of iconectiv to Koch Equity for $1 billion. This transaction was completed a year later.

=== Francisco Partners investment ===
On August 10, 2017, Francisco Partners announced a $200 million investment in iconectiv and received a 16.7 percent ownership stake in the company. In 2025, when Ericsson sold the company, FP also did the same with its equity stake.

== Notable clients ==
In 2015, iconectiv won a contract procured by the Federal Communications Commission (FCC) to operate the Number Portability Administration Center (NPAC). The service had been operated by Neustar Inc. for 18 years. iconectiv completed the transition from Neustar on May 29, 2018 becoming the Local Number Portability Administrator (LNPA) for the United States.

iconectiv was awarded the contract from CTIA to provide Common Short Code (CSC) Registry Services, effective January 1, 2016.

In 2019, the Secure Telephone Identity Governance Authority (STI-GA) selected iconectiv as the U.S. STI Policy Administrator for supervising measures to ensure voice calls have accurate caller ID.

== See also ==
- LERG Routing Guide
