= Phoneword =

Alphanumeric equivalents of telephone numbers

Many telephone keypads have letters with the numbers, from which words can be formed.

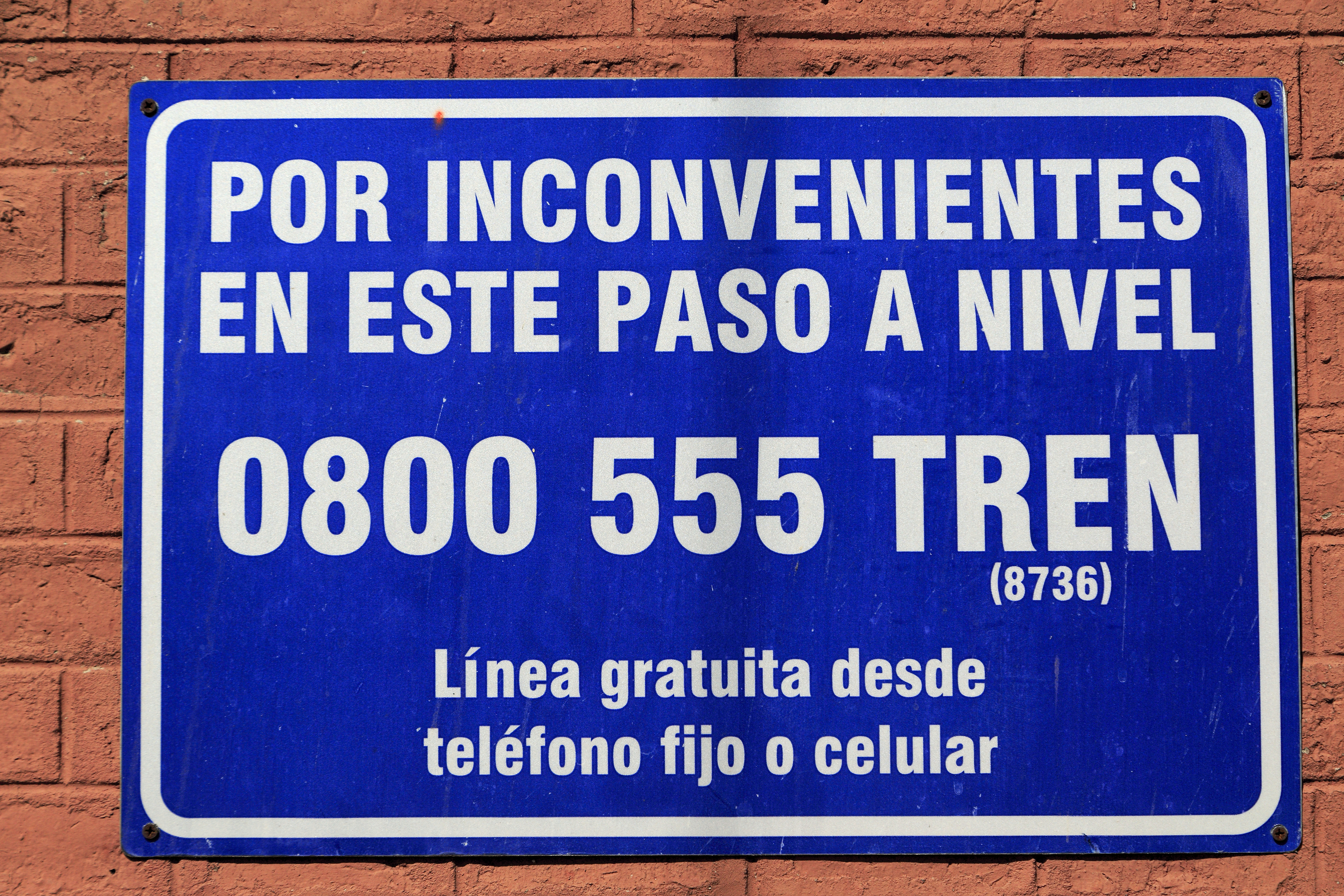
Sign in Argentina giving the number 0800 555 8736 as 0800 555 TREN

Phonewords are mnemonic phrases represented as alphanumeric equivalents of a telephone number. In many countries, the digits on the telephone keypad also have letters assigned. By replacing the digits of a telephone number with the corresponding letters, it is sometimes possible to form a whole or partial word, an acronym, abbreviation, or some other alphanumeric combination.

Phonewords are the most common vanity numbers, although a few all-numeric vanity phone numbers are used. Toll-free telephone numbers are often branded using phonewords; some firms use easily memorable vanity telephone numbers like 1-800 Contacts, 1-800-Flowers, 1-866-RING-RING, or 1-800-GOT-JUNK? as brands for flagship products or names for entire companies.

Local numbers are also occasionally used, such as +1-514-AUTOBUS or STM-INFO to reach the Société de transport de Montréal, but are constrained by the fact that the first few digits are tied to a geographic location, potentially limiting the available choices based on which telephone exchanges serve a local area.

== Advantages ==
The main advantages of phonewords over standard phone numbers include increased memorability and increased response rates to advertising. They are easier to remember than numeric phone numbers; thus, when businesses use them as a direct response tool in their advertising (radio, television, print, outdoor, etc.), their memorability tends to have a favorable effect on response rates. Regular side-by-side testing of phonewords and phone numbers in TV and radio advertising in Australia has shown that phonewords generate up to twice as many calls as standard phone numbers. A study conducted by Roy Morgan Research in February 2006 indicated that 92% of Australians were familiar with alphanumeric dialling.

== Disadvantages ==
In the age of advanced mobile devices, there are some disadvantages to using phonewords. Devices with physical keyboards such as BlackBerry and some other smartphones do not have the apportioned letters on the keys used for dialing, so one is unable to do alphabetic dialing without some other cross-reference to the actual phone number. This can be overcome by phonewords also being accompanied by the actual numeric phone number, allowing users of such smartphones to dial using the numeric phone number.

However, devices which have virtual keyboards, including iOS and Android devices, will translate phoneword phone numbers in webpages and SMS messages to their proper digits within a hyperlink leading to that device's phone app, and their keypads show the appropriate local mapping of letters within their virtual dialpad.

Some models of smartphones allow the user to enter letters into the device’s dialing window to allow the completion of phonewords. Numerous Blackberry models allow this feature by using the ALT key when pressing a key to select the letter, and not the number on the key.

On older landline telephones, the O, Q and Z sometimes vary in placement or are omitted entirely; this is not an issue for most mobile telephones as all 26 letters must be provided to support short message service transmission.

The dialing of 1 or 0 instead of I or O in phonewords can lead to misdialed calls; one such typosquatting incident targeted 1-800-HOLIDAY (+1-800-465-4329, the toll-free direct reservations line for Holiday Inn) by subscribing 1-800-H0LIDAY (+1-800-405-4329, the same number with "o" replaced by "zero") to a rival vendor which stood to collect a profitable travel agent's commission.

== Regional variations ==
=== Australia ===
Phonewords were officially introduced into Australia following the release of the appropriate number ranges by the Australian Communications and Media Authority in August 2004. The ACMA markets the rights of use to the phonewords (also referred to as smartnumbers) via an online auction.

Some phonewords have sold for as much as A$1 million with 13TAXI raising A$1,005,000. Proposed ranges of prices for SmartNumbers are listed by the Australian Communications Authority.

The types of numbers that are most commonly used include ten-digit numbers beginning with "1300", and "1800", and six-digit numbers beginning with "13".

The annual license cost to use 1800 and 1300 is approximately A$1, while 13 costs A$10,000. 1300 and 13 numbers share call costs between the caller and call recipient, while 1800 numbers are paid by the recipient and free to the caller.

=== Japan ===
Numbers can be used to spell out words in the Japanese language, a practice called goroawase. Most services are used by commercial establishments as an attempt to make their numbers easier to remember. Toll free numbers in Japan are prefixed with 0120. Examples include 0120-363963, where the numbers 3963 can also be read as サンキューローソン (sankyuu rooson, "Thank you, Lawson"), and 0120-026-999 in which 026-999 can be read as オフロでキュッキュッキュ (お風呂で急々々 ofuro de kyukkyukkyu), which literally means "bath - quick, quick, quick".

=== North America ===
Phonewords have been widely used for both local and toll-free numbers, with significant growth in the 1980s and 1990s.

Local telephone numbers have always been subject to the constraint that the first digits must identify a geographic location, leaving less flexibility to select digits which spell specific phonewords. Toll-free numbering, as originally introduced by AT&T in 1967, was initially even more limited, as each geographic area code was hardwired to one or two specific exchanges in the +1-800 toll-free area code. This changed after Roy P. Weber of Bell Labs patented a "Data base communication call processing method" which laid the initial blueprint for construction of the SMS/800 database in 1982 and the portable RespOrg structure in 1993. A toll-free number, instead of indicating a geographic location, was merely a pointer to a database record; any number could geographically be reassigned anywhere and ported to any carrier. All seven digits were available to construct vanity numbers or phonewords.

As toll-free telephone numbers, vanity 800 numbers support flexible call tracking which allows businesses to determine where their incoming call traffic is coming from, build a database of leads, access demographic information on callers, allocate personnel based on calling patterns, analyze ad campaign results and export data to other programs. The reports help to fine-tune advertising plans and media budgets by providing detailed information on specific media buys (such as radio, television or outdoor media).

Some companies also match domain names to phone words (for instance, 1800-THRIFTY and the web site www.1800thrifty.com) to target phone and web users together.

One brief practice was when the successive toll-free area codes were introduced (888, 877, 866, etc.), a business word or phrase would actually use one or more of the numbers in the area code. Examples of this were Rent-A-Wreck (1-87-RENT-A-WRECK or 1-US-RENT-A-WRECK), Speedpass (1-87-SPEEDPASS), and one of the first Vonage numbers (1-VONAGE-HELP). However, these proved to be more confusing than helpful to the callers, so the practice is not often used.

Historically Canada used a different scheme to map letter to numbers, similar to the one used in the UK at the time: the letters "Q" and "Z" were omitted and the remaining 24 letters laid out in groups of three, from "ABC" on the "2" key to "WXY" on the "9" key.

=== Russia ===
When the telephone appeared in Russia at the beginning of the 20th century, telephone numbers mixed letters and numbers. In 1968, the letters were replaced by numbers; however, recently phonewords have returned to popularity in Russia. Many ISPs offer customers vanity numbers.

=== United Kingdom ===
In earlier times exchange names were used and spoken to the operator; with the introduction of dialling, exchange names were used starting with three letters not used by any other exchange. Until about 1966 UK telephone numbers consisted of a three letter exchange prefix followed by digits; a number would be published as WHItehall 1212, and dialled 944 1212.

As direct dialling, rather than operator connection, was introduced universally, telephone keypads associated three letters with each digit. The scheme used for relating letters to key numbers was different from the one currently used; while generally similar, the letters "O" and "Q" were not mapped to the "6" and "7" keys to avoid confusion between the digit "0" and the letters; (Canada used a similar scheme) instead the zero key was used for "O" and "Q". "Z" was not included, and no symbols were associated with the "1" key. The use of letter prefixes fell out of use; the number formerly published as WHItehall 1212 was now stated as 944 1212, although dialled in exactly the same way. Numbers that did not map onto words were now also allocated as exchange prefixes.

== Generating phonewords ==
Although businesses typically choose phone numbers so as to correspond to particular phonewords, it is also possible to go in the other direction, and generate phonewords corresponding to given numbers.

== See also ==
- Custom Toll Free
- E.161
- T9 (predictive algorithm)
- Teledotcom
- Telephone exchange names
- Telephone numbering plan
- Telephone number
- Toll-free telephone number
- Vanity plate
