= Philip L. Becker House =

Philip L. Becker Residence
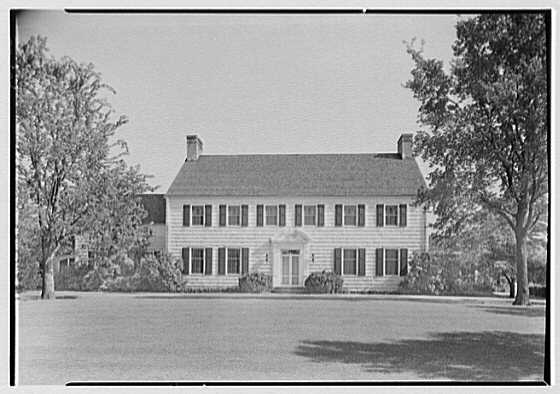
- The Philip L. Becker Residence in 1941
- Interactive map of the Philip L. Becker Residence area

General information
- Type: Single-family home
- Architectural style: Colonial
- Location: Incorporated Village of Flower Hill, 11 Bonnie Heights Road, Manhasset, NY 11030
- Coordinates: 40°48′32.4″N 73°40′50.4″W

Design and construction
- Architect: Henry T. Aspinwall

The Philip L. Becker House is a house located within the Incorporated Village of Flower Hill, in Nassau County, New York, United States.

== Description ==
The home, located on Bonnie Heights Road in the Village of Flower Hill, was built in 1937. Philip L. Becker, the board chairman of the American Chicle Company and later the chairman of the Village of Flower Hill's Planning Board, purchased this 3-acre (1.2 ha) parcel of land in 1937 from Carlos Munson. L'Ecluse, Washburn, & Co. acted as the real estate agents in the transaction. William P. McCool was the attorney representing Carlos Munson in the sale of the land, and Taylor & Roberts were the attorneys for Philip Becker.

After purchasing the land, Becker proceeded to erect this home on the property.

The home was designed by Henry T. Aspinwall, and was built in the colonial architectural style.

On July 15, 1941, the home was photographed by Gottscho-Schleisner, Inc. These photos are part of the Library of Congress' Gottscho-Schleisner Collection.

Although Philip Becker died in 1960, Nassau County property records indicate that the home remained in the hands of the Becker family until at least the 1970s. It would later be owned by businessman James McCann.

== See also ==
- Elderfields Preserve – A preserve located on the remaining portion of Carlos Munson's estate of the same name.
