= Wide Area Telephone Service =

Primitive long-distance flat-rate plan

Wide Area Telephone Service (WATS) was a flat-rate long-distance service for customer dial-type telecommunications in the service areas of the North American Numbering Plan (NANP).

The service was between a given customer phone (also known as a "station") and stations within specified geographic rate areas, employing a single telephone line between the customer location and the serving central office. Each access line could be arranged for outward (OUT-WATS) or inward (IN-WATS) service, or both.

WATS was introduced by the Bell System in 1961 as a long-distance flat-rate plan by which a business could obtain a special line with an included number of hours ('measured time' or 'full-time') of long-distance calling to a specified area. These lines were most often connected to private branch exchanges in large businesses. WATS lines were the basis for the first direct-dial toll-free 1-800-numbers (intrastate in 1966, interstate in 1967); by 1976, WATS brought AT&T Corporation a billion dollars in annual revenue ($5.66 billion in 2025 dollars)

For outbound calls, the 1984 AT&T divestiture brought multiple competitors offering similar services using standard business telephone lines; the special WATS line was ultimately supplanted by other flat-rate offerings. The requirement that an inbound toll-free number terminate at a special WATS line or fixed-rate service was also rendered obsolete by the 1980s due to intelligent network capability and technological improvement in the 800-service. A toll-free number may now terminate at a T-carrier line, at any standard local telephone number or at one of multiple destinations based on time of day, call origin, cost or other factors.

== Outbound WATS ==
For Outbound WATS, the United States was divided into geographical Bands 0 through 5. Band zero was intrastate calling and bands 1 through 5 (or 6) were interstate calls that were progressively further from the originating number. Historically, the higher band number carried a higher price per month or per minute. These lines could be used for outbound long-distance only; not local. In the U.S., interstate WATS lines could not be used for intrastate calls, and vice versa. With wider availability of inexpensive long distance using regular business lines, OutWATS service became obsolete late in the 20th century.

== InWATS ==
A form of toll-free telephone service in North America was the Zenith number, published in distant cities from where a company expected or desired frequent customer calls. Published as "Zenith" and a four- or five-digit number, these collect calls required operator assistance. The subscriber of the service was charged for the call.

With "inward WATS", introduced for interstate calls by the American Telephone and Telegraph Company (AT&T) in 1967, subscribers were issued a toll-free telephone number in a designated toll-free area code. Unlike a standard collect call or a call to a Zenith number, 1‑800 normally may be dialed directly with no live operator. Callers within a designated area could call without incurring a toll charge as the recipient paid for the calls at a fixed rate.

The introduction of InWATS fortuitously came at about the same time as the early centralized, automated national airline and hotel reservation systems, including Sabre (American Airlines, 1963), Holidex (Holiday Inn, 1965) and Reservatron (Sheraton, 1969). Hundreds of local reservation numbers for a major chain could be replaced with one central number, backed by a national computerized reservation system.

InWATS exchanges were assigned to Canada and other North American Numbering Plan countries, but the original InWATS in each country accepted domestic calls only. Initially 1‑800‑NN2‑XXXX numbers were U.S. intrastate and specific prefixes (such as 1‑800‑387 Toronto and 1‑800‑267 Ottawa) were assigned to Canada. In the 1970s, AT&T's internal routing guides included separate U.S. and Canadian 1-800 exchange maps which looked much like area code maps as each geographic area code had one or more specific freephone exchange prefixes. Sheraton's 800‑325‑3535, one of the notable early adopters in late 1969, was hard-wired into St. Louis area code 314; 1‑800‑HOLIDAY at that time could not be a U.S. number if the 1‑800‑465 prefix was hard-wired to Thunder Bay's area code 807. Any attempt to call a foreign 1‑800 gave a pre-recorded error message, "The number you have dialed is not available from your calling area."

Like the OutWATS service, AT&T's InWATS was divided into intrastate and interstate, with interstate calls priced into five or six "bands" of calling. This favored placement of US national call centers in low-population Midwestern states such as Nebraska, whose central location meant a carefully situated "band 3" number reaching halfway across the US in every direction could potentially reach 47 states. A San Diego call center would be less fortunate; even with "band 6" (the most expensive lines), its national number would be unreachable to millions as California is a populous state and intrastate calls needed a separate toll-free number.

The original InWATS system was supplanted by "Advanced 800 Service" in the 1980s. Modern systems eliminated requirements tying toll-free numbers to dedicated flat-rate inbound WATS lines. Direct inward dial, introduced in 1983, allowed one trunk to carry calls for multiple numbers. AT&T's monopoly on U.S. toll-free number routing ended in 1986, encouraging flexibility in order to match rivals Sprint and MCI. By 1989, fixed "bands" of coverage area had been largely replaced by distance-based billing, a growing number of 1‑800 numbers were being terminated at standard local business or residence lines and one number could be sent to multiple locations based on call origin, least-cost routing or time of day routing. RespOrgs were established in the U.S. in 1993 and Canada in 1994 to provide toll free number portability using the Service Management System (SMS/800) database. Calls from Canada and the U.S., intrastate and interstate, could terminate at the same 1‑800 number, even via different carriers. Vanity numbers became easier to obtain as a toll-free exchange prefix was no longer tied to a geographic location. By the 21st century, Voice over IP placed toll-free and foreign exchange numbers into the hands of even the smallest users, to whom dedicated inbound lines under the original InWATS model would have been prohibitively expensive.

== Civil Rights Movement ==
During the Civil Rights Movement in the U.S., activist organizations such as SNCC used WATS as a convenient way for eyewitnesses on the ground to convey information quickly. Notes from these phone calls were compiled into "WATS Line Reports" and mailed to civil rights leaders, the media, the Justice Department, and others involved in the events. WATS was also how organizations communicated with local leaders across the country. A "Bay Area Friends of SNCC" newsletter in 1965 described WATS:

The WATS (Wide Area Telephone Service) line is the heart of all SNCC security and communications. For a flat monthly rate, an unlimited number of calls can be dialed directly to any place in the country — or the state — depending on what line one uses. The Jackson office has a state-wide line, the Atlanta office has the national WATS line. Both run on a 24-hour basis. A project worker can call in news of any incident, threat or major activity to the Jackson office. The WATS operator there takes down the details and relays it to Atlanta if the event is of national importance. In the case of a threat or incident involving Federal laws, Jackson will notify the FBI and the Justice Department. Atlanta uses its national WATS line to notify SNCC groups around the country.
