= Area codes 416, 647, 437, and 942 =

Telephone area codes for Toronto, Ontario

Coordinates: 43.687°N 79.393°W

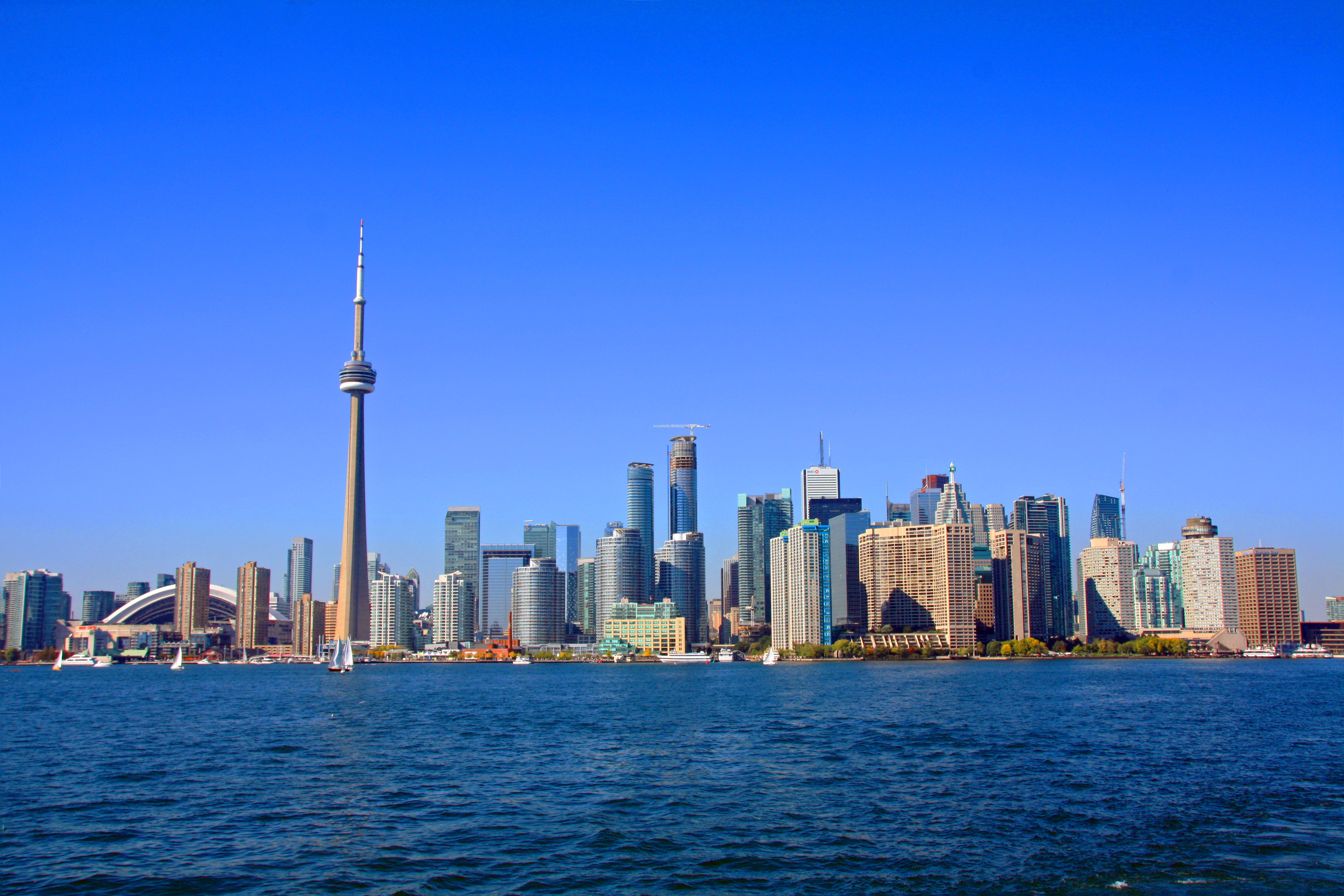
Toronto

Area codes 416, 647, 437, and 942 are telephone overlay area codes in the North American Numbering Plan (NANP) for the city of Toronto, Ontario, Canada.

Area code 416 was assigned as one of the original North American area codes to a numbering plan area (NPA) in southern Ontario in 1947. After reductions in geographic reach by area code splits in 1953 and 1993, area codes 647, 437, and 942 were added to the remaining service area to provide additional numbering resources.

The incumbent local exchange carrier in the NPA is Bell Canada. Almost all Toronto Bell Canada landlines have area code 416, with 647 numbers allocated disproportionately to a growing mobile telephone market and to competitive local exchange carriers, such as cable and voice-over-IP services. Telephone numbers are portable, with few exceptions for specific services such as pocket pagers. The competitive local exchange carriers in the numbering plan area are Rogers Communications, Telus, and some independent companies.

Demand for telephone numbers with area code 416 for mobile, foreign exchange and voice over IP service in the 905-suburbs (Durham, Peel, York and Halton regions) has elevated the local significance of these numbers as their local calling area is a superset of that of a suburban number.

== History ==
Evolution of area codes in Ontario and southwestern Quebec

Toronto's original manual telephone exchanges were recognized by an exchange name and a block of four-digit line numbers. The "GRover exchange" at Kingston Road and Main Street in East Toronto became the first Canadian dial exchange in 1924. Montréal got its first dial telephones one year later. The numbers were dialled as two letters and four digits (2L+4N). Grover 1234 was dialled GR-1234 (or 47-1234). Conversion to seven-digit (2L+5N) format began in 1951, and continued until the introduction of direct distance dialling (DDD) in 1958.

Area code 416 was one of the 86 original North American area codes, assigned by the American Telephone and Telegraph Company (AT&T) for Operator Toll Dialing in 1947. It comprised Southern Ontario including the populous Golden Horseshoe region in southern Ontario. Ontario and Quebec were the only provinces to be assigned multiple area codes at the inception of the continental telephone numbering plan.

Area code 416 has been split twice. The first came in 1953, when its western portion (including Kitchener) was combined with the southern portion of area code 613 to form a new numbering plan area with area code 519. This left 416 largely coextensive with the area that is generally recognized as the core of the Golden Horseshoe. Despite rapid growth in the Greater Toronto Area (GTA) in the second half of the 20th century, this configuration remained for 40 years.

By the late 1980s, 416 approached exhaustion of available central office codes because of the GTA's continued growth. All competing carriers are assigned 10,000-number blocks, which correspond roughly to a single prefix, in each rate centre in which it plans to offer service, regardless of its actual subscriber count.

The rapid growth in telecommunication services in the Greater Toronto Area in the 1990s, with the proliferation of cell phones, fax machines, and pagers, made it apparent that the Golden Horseshoe needed another area code. This resulted in a second split of 416 which took effect on October 2, 1993. The 416 numbering plan area was reduced to Metro Toronto (East York, Etobicoke, North York, Toronto, Scarborough, and York), while the rest of the Golden Horseshoe (the Niagara Peninsula, the regional municipalities of Durham, Halton, Hamilton–Wentworth, Peel, and York, and parts of Northumberland County) were assigned area code 905. Permissive dialling, during which dialling of either 416 or 905 was acceptable in a dialled number terminating in the new NPA, was effective until March 26, 1994.

With the amalgamation of Metro Toronto into the "megacity" of Toronto in 1998, 416 became the only Canadian area code to serve just one rate centre and just one city. Many of Canada's larger cities, especially "megacities" that have been created from mergers of previously separate cities (such as Ottawa and Hamilton), are split between multiple rate centres that have never been amalgamated. Toronto is an exception; it has been a single rate centre, by far Canada's largest, since 1977, with the merger of the historical Agincourt, Don Mills, Islington, New Toronto, Scarborough, West Hill, Weston, and Willowdale exchanges into the Toronto exchange.

The 1993 split had been intended as a long-term solution for Canada's largest toll-free calling zone. Within five years, however, 416 was once again approaching exhaustion. Toronto's size and status as a single rate centre have caused numbers to tend to be used up fairly quickly. Therefore, the number allocation problem was not nearly as serious as in other Canadian cities that are split between multiple rate centres. Splitting Toronto between two area codes, a solution adopted in the United States for cities like New York City, Chicago and Los Angeles, was ruled out because of the area's high population density and the lack of a suitable boundary along which to split. Another option was adding an overlay area code to 416. Overlays were a new concept at the time, and were controversial because of the requirement for ten-digit dialling. Despite this, Bell and other telephone companies pressed for an overlay since they wanted to spare customers the expense and burden of having to change telephone numbers, which would have required a massive reprogramming of cellular telephones. Ultimately, the decision was in favour of an overlay.

On March 5, 2001, 416 was overlaid with area code 647, creating Canada's first overlay. The implementation of 647 made ten-digit dialling mandatory in Toronto. Within a decade, however, the continued proliferation of cell phones brought both 416 and 647 close to exhaustion once again. A new overlay area code, 437, started operation on March 25, 2013. That effectively allocates 24 million numbers to a city of 2.5 million people.

Since the implementation of area code 647, overlays have become the preferred solution for exhaustion relief in Canada. Not only do they eliminate the need for renumbering existing subscriber accounts, but they are an easy workaround for the number allocation problem. As of April 28, 2023, all eight of Canada's original NPAs have been overlaid. Only three Canadian area codes (709, 807, and 867) are still single-code areas, without overlay, still allowing seven-digit dialling for local calls.

A 2020 exhaust analysis by the NANPA projected exhaustion in 2025 for central office prefixes in the service area.

In relief planning since 2023, area code 942 was activated for service in the numbering plan area on April 26, 2025, to provide new numbering resources.

Area code 387 has been reserved for future use in Toronto.

== Local calling area ==
Toronto is the centre of the largest local calling area in Canada, and one of the largest toll-free calling zones in North America. As of 2013, the following points in area code 905 were a local call to 416 in Toronto: Ajax-Pickering, Aurora, Beeton, Bethesda, Bolton, Brampton, Caledon East, Campbellville, Castlemore, Claremont, Georgetown, Gormley, King City, Markham, Milton, Mississauga (rate centres Clarkson, Cooksville, Malton, Nobleton, Port Credit and Streetsville) Oak Ridges, Oakville, Palgrave, Richmond Hill, Schomberg, Snelgrove, South Pickering, Stouffville, Thornhill, Tottenham, Unionville, Uxbridge, Vaughan (rate centres Kleinburg, Maple and Woodbridge) and Victoria. Caledon in area code 519 is also a local call to Toronto. Many of these suburban areas are long-distance to each other, particularly, but not exclusively, those which are across Toronto from each other (i.e., north versus east versus west of Toronto).

== In popular culture ==
In the Greater Toronto Area, the terms the 416 is also used to describe the area within Toronto proper, and Toronto residents are called 416ers. The suburbs are referred to as the 905 or the 905 belt, and suburbanites are called 905ers (in this use the term does not include the more distant parts of area code 905, such as Niagara Falls).

The 647 area code does not carry the same strong geographic associations as it disproportionately contains nomadic services (such as mobile telephones and voice over IP); an incumbent Bell land line is hard-wired to a specific location in area 416, postal code M. Some have paid a premium for a true 416 number as the code gives the appearance of a local, long-established business instead of a new entrant.

On March 17, 1966, The Munsters episode "A Visit from Johann" depicted a person-to-person call to a Happy Valley Lodge in the 416 area code. A hamlet of Happy Valley exists in King Township, in 416 at the time, but now in 905 (as part of York Region).

In 1994, food delivery chain Pizza Pizza obtained a Canadian registered trademark on its 416 telephone number, 967–1111, which had featured in distinctive radio advertising jingles since the 1970s.

Toronto rapper Maestro Fresh Wes rendered homage to the area code in his 1998 song "416/905 (TO Party Anthem)". Rapper Drake has a tattoo of the number on his rib to symbolize Toronto as his birthplace. Drake has also released his fourth studio album, titled Views, referring to the 416 and 647 area codes. His album picture is of him sitting on top of the CN Tower in Toronto.

== Central office codes ==
All central office codes reside within the rate centre of Toronto. In some cases, 416 prefixes are available to wire centres outside Toronto city limits which serve Toronto subscribers (such as MALTON22 in Mississauga, which serves an airport hotel strip in Toronto).

=== Exchange names ===
Toronto's original manual telephone exchanges used exchange names, each serving a block of four-digit telephone numbers. The GRover exchange at Kingston Road and Main Street in East Toronto was the first Canadian dial exchange in 1924. Montréal in Quebec got its first dial telephones one year later. The numbers were dialled with two letters and four digits (2L-4N). For example, GRover 1234 was dialled GR1234 (or 471234). Conversion to seven-digit (2L-5N) format began in 1951, and continued up to the introduction of direct distance dialling (DDD) in 1958.

Toronto numbers that were converted from 2L-4N format, or from manual service, include:

- 416–363, 364, 366, 368 (EMpire 3,4,6,8) were ADelaide, ELgin, PLaza and WAverly in the Adelaide St (Queen West) area west of downtown. These were the first to be lengthened to 2L-5N in 1951–1953.
- 416-861 (UNiversity 1) was TRinity exchange in the Adelaide St (Queen West) area west of downtown (lengthened to 2L-5N in 1955).
- 416–921, 922, 923, 924 (WAlnut 1,2,3,4) were RAndolph, KIngsdale, MIdway and PRincess (lengthened to 2L-5N in 1954) in the Annex.
- 416–691, 694, 699 (OXford 1,4,9) were HOward, GRover, OXford (lengthened to 2L-5N in 1955) in East Toronto. These numbers usually relate to the Beaches and Upper Beaches neighbourhoods or to Crescent Town in East York.
- 416–461, 463, 465, 466 (HOward 1,3,5,6) were RIverdale, GErrard, GLadstone, HArgrave east of downtown (lengthened to 2L-5N in 1957).
- 416–483, 485, 488, 489 (HUdson 3,5,8,9) were MOhawk, MAyfair (lengthened to 2L-5N in 1958) and HUdson, HYland (lengthened to 2L-5N in 1953); these served the Eglinton area, then the northernmost point on the TTC subway (1954).
- 416–782, 783 (RUssell 2,3) were ORchard, REdfern (lengthened to 2L-5N in 1958) in the Willowdale/Weston areas in the north of the city.
- 416–762, 766, 767, 769 (ROger 2,6,7,9) were MUrray, ROdney, LYndhurst, JUnction (lengthened to 2L-5N in 1955) in the Runnymede/Toronto Junction area in the west end.
- 416–531, 532, 533, 534, 535, 536 (LEnnox 1,2,3,4,5,6) were MElrose, LAkeside, KEnwood, OLiver, LLoydbrook, LOmbard in the Dufferin Street area west of downtown (lengthened to 2L-5N in 1956).

Additional named exchanges were created (as 2L-5N) in the late 1950s to accommodate expansion into then-growing suburbs such as Don Mills (GArden), Agincourt (AXminster/CYpress), Islington (BElmont/CEdar), New Toronto (CLifford), Scarborough (AMherst, PLymouth), West Hill (ATlantic), Weston (CHerry, MElrose) and Willowdale (BAldwin/ACademy). Exchange names were phased out in 1961–1966 in favour of plain seven-digit numbers.

== See also ==
- List of Ontario area codes
- List of North American Numbering Plan area codes

Ontario area codes: 416/437/647/942, 519/226/548/382, 613/343/753, 705/249/683, 807, 905/289/365/742
	North: 905/289/365/742	
West: 905/289/365/742	416/437/647/942	East: 905/289/365/742
	South: Lake Ontario; 905/289/365/742	
