= Universal International Shared Cost Number =

Universal International Shared Cost Number (UISCN) is part of the E.164 telephone numbering space that includes international telephone numbers where the call costs are split between the caller and the called. An international shared-cost number allows the calling party to make the call at national rates, since the costs of any international routing will be borne by the called party.

The International Telecommunication Union (ITU) has allocated the country code 808 to this service.

As of 2023, the only companies that had requested UISCN number allocation were Swisscom (Switzerland), SMSRelay (Switzerland, now defunct) and Mr Next Id (now DTMS; Germany).

== See also ==
- Shared-cost service
- List of country calling codes
