= 1-800-Flowers.com, Inc. =

American flowers and gifts retailer

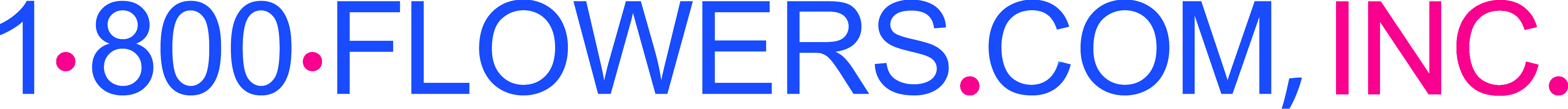

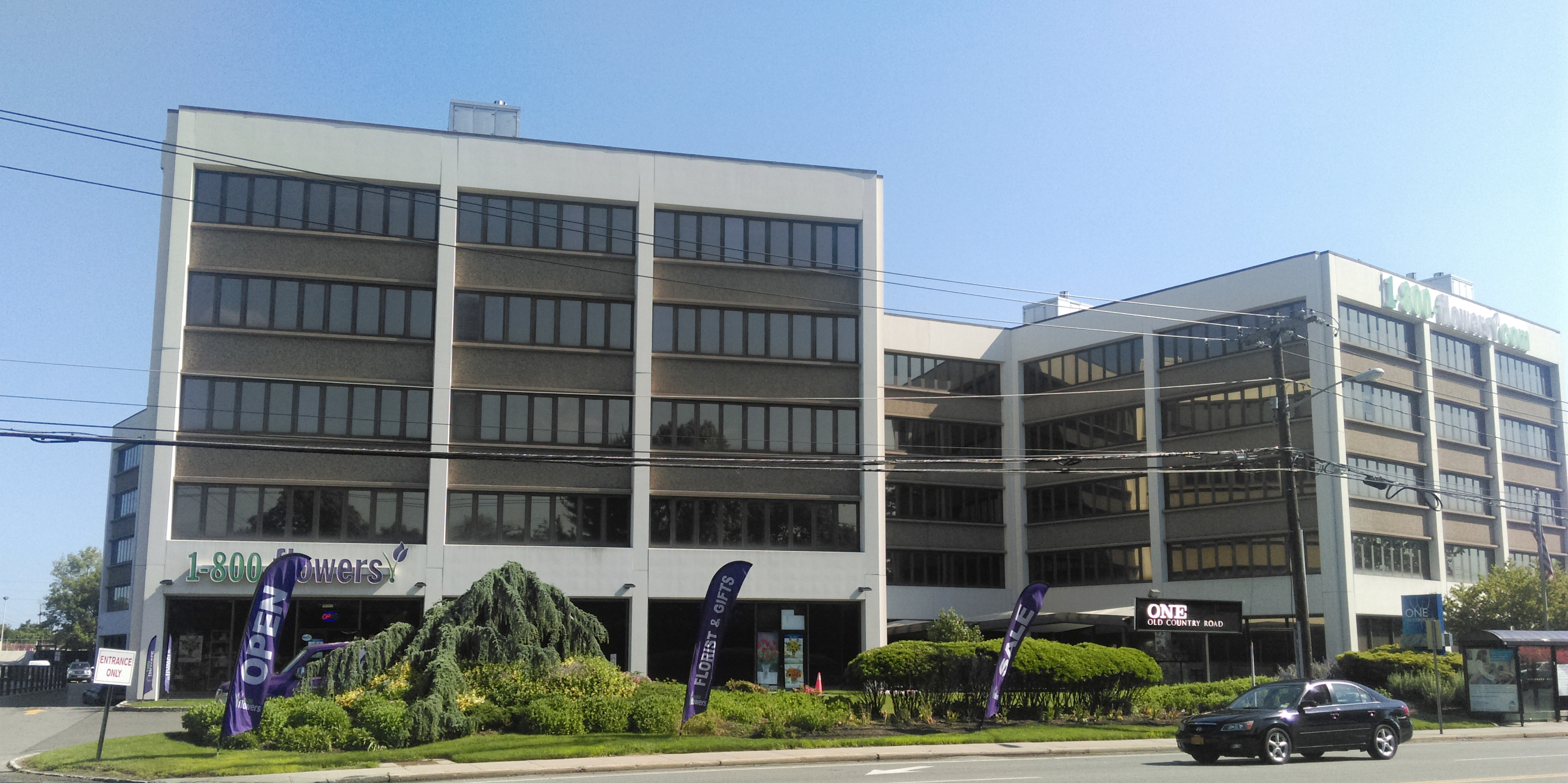
- Offices in Carle Place
- Type: Public
- Traded as: Nasdaq: FLWS (Class A); Russell 2000 Component
- Industry: Retail
- Founded: 1976; 50 years ago
- Founder: James McCann, John Davis
- Headquarters: Jericho, New York, United States
- Key people: James McCann (chairman); Chris McCann (CEO)
- Products: Flowers; Gift baskets; Plants; Food; Collectibles
- Revenue: ▼US$1.69 billion (2025)
- Net income: ▼ −US$200 million (2025)
- Subsidiaries: Harry & David
- Website: 1800flowersinc.com

1-800-Flowers.com, Inc. is a floral and foods gift retailer and distribution company in the United States. The company's focus, except for Mother's Day and Valentine's Day, is on gift baskets. They also use the name 1-800-Baskets.com. Their use of "coyly self-descriptive telephone numbers" is part of founder James McCann's business model.

== History ==
=== Founding and early years ===
William Alexander originated the concept of using the word "flowers" within a phoneword in the early 1980s. The phone number, 1-800-356-9377, was originally randomly assigned to a Wisconsin trucking brokerage owned by Curtis Jahn, which used it until 1981. In 1982, Granville Semmes and David Snow formed a Louisiana corporation and began to use the number to sell flowers under an agreement with Jahn that was later contested. This use of the number triggered a series of lawsuits. After their business failed, the company was dissolved, and its assets were transferred to Texas investors James Poage and John Davis. The new corporation also faced financial difficulties. In 1986, McCann, an owner of several New York City flower shops since 1976, acquired the assets and expanded the business.

The company expanded in 1994 by purchasing Conroy's Flowers, followed by the registration of its domain name, 1800flowers.com, on September 1, 1995. The company went public on the NASDAQ in 1999. In May 2006, it acquired Alpine Confections Inc. brands including Fannie May Confections, Fannie Farmer, and Harry London Candies for $85 million. The company then partnered with Martha Stewart Living Omnimedia in September 2007 to produce a floral product line inspired by Martha Stewart.

According to the Consumerist in 2008, customers reported unknowingly being subscribed to a "membership" called LiveWell after receiving rebate checks from 1-800-Flowers. By that year, the company employed 4,000 people and held a market cap of $119 million. Its revenue in 2009 was $714 million, operating income was $72.2 million, net income was $98.4 million, assets were valued at $286 million, and equity was at $134 million. In March 2017, Fannie May and Harry London were sold to Ferrero SpA for $115 million.

=== Acquisitions ===
- March 2005, Cheryl's Cookies
- May 2006, Alpine Confections Inc. brands including Fannie May Confections, Fannie Farmer and Harry London Candies
- April 1, 2008, DesignPac Gifts LLC.
- July 21, 2008, Napco Marketing Corporation.
- August 1, 2011, Flowerama.
- August 5, 2019, Shari's Berries
- August 3, 2020, Personalization Mall
- October 28, 2021, Vital Choice
- January 14, 2022, Alice Table
- May 02, 2023, SmartGift

== See also ==
- Vanity numbers
- Phonewords
