= Local Access and Transport Area =

Geographical area of the United States, used in telephone service

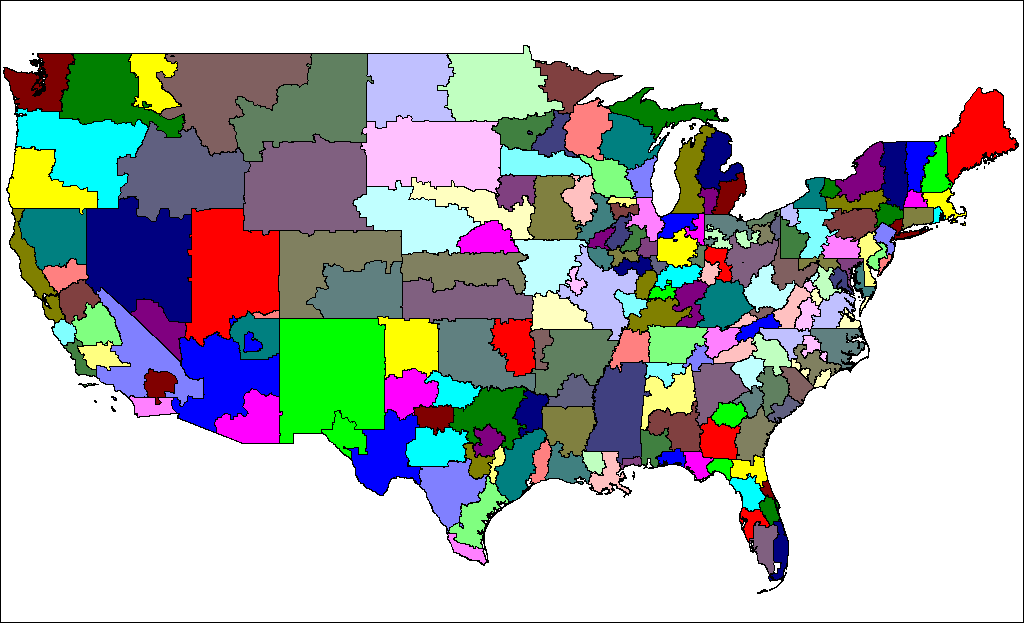
Map of LATAs in the US

Local Access And Transport Area (LATA) is a term defined in United States telecommunications regulation. A LATA is a geographical area of the United States under the terms of the Modification of Final Judgment (MFJ) entered by the United States District Court for the District of Columbia in Civil Action number 82-0192 or any other geographic area designated as a LATA in the National Exchange Carrier Association, Inc., Tariff FCC No. 4, that precipitated the breakup of the original AT&T into the "Baby Bells" or created since that time for wireline regulation.

Generally, a LATA represents an area within which a divested Regional Bell Operating Company (RBOC) is permitted to offer exchange telecommunications and exchange access services. Under the terms of the MFJ, the RBOCs are generally prohibited from providing services that originate in one LATA and terminate in another.

LATA boundaries tend to be drawn around markets, and not necessarily along existing state or area code borders. Some LATAs cross over state boundaries, such as those for the New York metropolitan area and Greenwich, Connecticut; Chicago, Illinois; Portland, Oregon; and areas between Maryland, Virginia, and West Virginia. Area codes and LATAs do not necessarily share boundaries; many LATAs exist in multiple area codes, and many area codes exist in multiple LATAs.

Originally, the LATAs were grouped into regions within which one particular RBOC was allowed to provide services. The LATAs in each of these regions are numbered beginning with the same digit. Generally, the LATAs were associated with carriers or other indications in the following manner:

Digit	Area/Use	RBOC
0xx	unused	
1xx	New York & New England	NYNEX (now Verizon and Consolidated Communications)
2xx	Mid-Atlantic	Bell Atlantic (now Verizon and Frontier)
3xx	Great Lakes	Ameritech (now AT&T Inc.)
4xx	Southeast	BellSouth (now AT&T Inc.)
5xx	South-central	Southwestern Bell (now AT&T Inc.)
6xx	Pacific Northwest, Midwest, and Rocky Mountains	US West (now CenturyLink)
7xx	California and Nevada	Pacific Bell (now AT&T Inc.)
8xx	Non-contiguous and international areas	
9xx	Other/Expansion	

In addition to this list, two local carriers were made independent: Cincinnati Bell in the Cincinnati area, and SNET (a former unit of AT&T, sold to Frontier) in Connecticut. These were assigned LATAs in the 9xx range.

Since the breakup of the Bell System in 1984, however, some amount of deregulation, as well as a number of phone company mergers, have blurred the significance of these regions. A number of new LATAs have been formed within these regions since their inception, most beginning with the digit 9.

LATAs contribute to an often confusing aspect of long-distance telephone service. Due to the various and overlapping regulatory limitations and inter-business arrangements, phone companies typically provide differing types of “long distance” service, each with potentially different rates:

- within same LATA, within same state
- within same LATA, between different states
- between different LATAs, within same state
- between different LATAs, between different states

Given the complexity of the legal and financial issues involved in each distinction, many long-distance companies tend to not explain the details of these different rates, which can lead to billing questions from surprised customers.

Local carriers have various alternative terms for LATAs such as “Service Area” by Pacific Bell in California, or “Regional Calling Area” by Verizon in Maryland.

To facilitate the sharing of Telcordia telephone routing databases between countries, LATAs were later defined for the provinces of Canada, the other countries and territories of the North American Numbering Plan, and Mexico. Aside from U.S. territories, LATAs have no regulatory purpose in these areas. In 2000, the Canadian Radio-television and Telecommunications Commission eliminated all Canadian provincial LATAs in favor of a single LATA for Canada (888).

No LATAs exist with a second digit of 0 or 1, which distinguished them from traditional area codes.

== List of LATAs ==
=== US state LATAs ===
The city or place name given with some LATAs is the name given to identify the LATA, not the limit of its boundary. Generally this is the most significant metropolitan area in the LATA. In some cases, a LATA is named after the largest phone exchange in the LATA that was historically served by an RBOC. For example, the largest city in the Pahrump LATA in Nevada is Las Vegas. Since Las Vegas was not historically served by an RBOC, the LATA is named after the smaller town of Pahrump, which was historically served by Nevada Bell (now AT&T Inc.). Also, listing under a state does not necessarily limit the LATA's territory to that state; there may be overlaps as well as enclaves. Areas that include notable portions of other states are explained, but not all LATA state overlaps may be detailed.

LATA boundaries are not always solidly defined. Inter-carrier agreements, change proposals to the Federal Communications Commission (FCC), and new wiring developments into rural areas can and do often alter the effective borders between LATAs. Many sources on LATA boundary information conflict with each other at detailed levels. Telcordia data may provide the most up-to-date details of LATA inclusions.

==== Alabama ====
- 476 Birmingham
- 477 Huntsville
- 478 Montgomery
  - Includes Georgetown, Georgia
- 480 Mobile
  - Includes areas of Mississippi north of Pascagoula
  - Includes parts of northern Escambia County, Florida, in the Century and Walnut Hill areas

==== Alaska ====
- 832

==== Arizona ====
- 666 Phoenix
  - Includes Winterhaven and Bard, California
  - Includes Spirit Mountain, Nevada
  - Includes Glen Canyon, Utah
- 668 Tucson
  - Includes Rodeo and Virden, New Mexico
- 980 Navajo Nation (Arizona portion)
  - Includes southwestern San Juan County, Utah

==== Arkansas ====
- 526 Fort Smith
  - Includes part of Oklahoma from Pocola to Moffett
  - Includes section of Oklahoma from Colcord to Watts
  - Includes small part of Barry County, Missouri
  - Includes area of Oklahoma near Maysville, Arkansas
  - Includes area of Oklahoma near Uniontown, Arkansas
- 528 Little Rock
  - Includes Watson, Oklahoma
- 530 Pine Bluff
  - Includes Junction City, Louisiana

==== California ====
- 722 San Francisco
- 724 Chico
- 726 Sacramento
- 728 Fresno
- 730 Los Angeles
  - Includes La Paz County, Arizona
- 732 San Diego
- 734 Bakersfield
- 736 Monterey
- 738 Stockton
- 740 San Luis Obispo
- 973 Palm Springs

==== Colorado ====
- 656 Denver
- 658 Colorado Springs

==== Connecticut ====
- 920

==== Washington, D.C. ====
- 236
  - Includes the west portion of the West Bay of Maryland, as far north as Damascus, Maryland (roughly Montgomery, Prince George's, Charles, and St. Mary's counties of Maryland)
  - Includes the northeasternmost portion of Virginia, from Sterling to just north of Fredericksburg (roughly Northern Virginia)

==== Florida ====
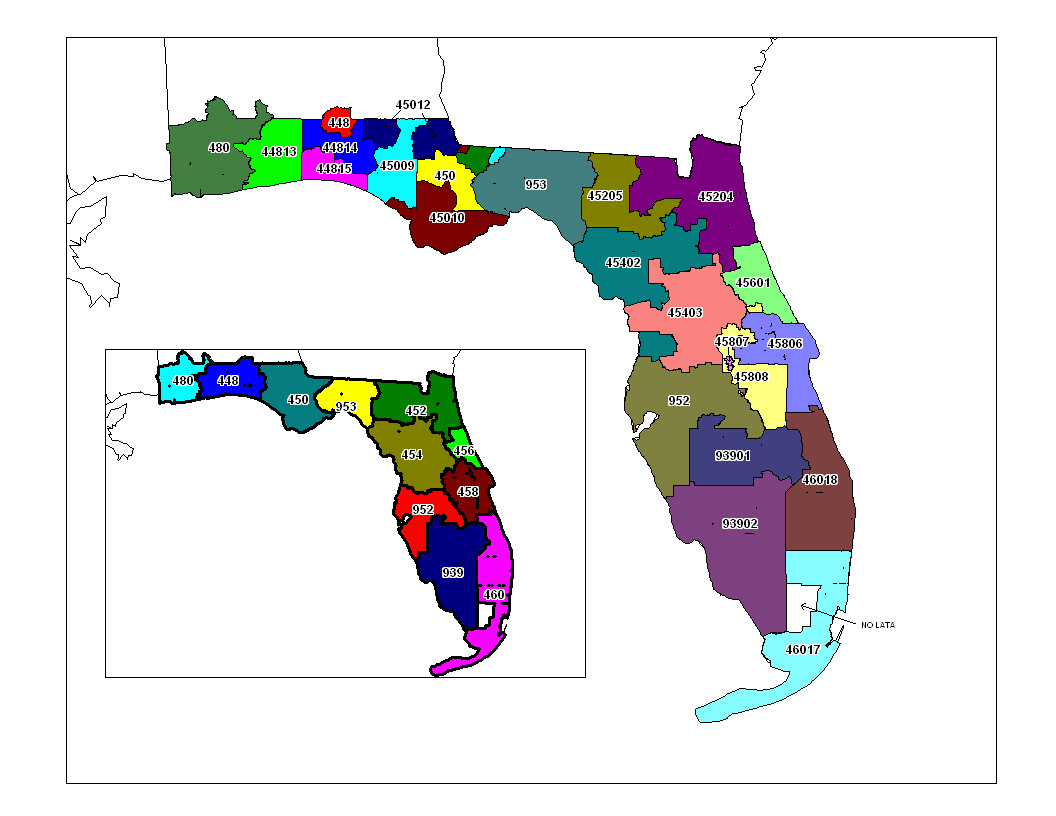
Map of FL 5-digit LATAs

- 448 Pensacola
  - Includes Clear Springs, Wing and Florala, Alabama
- 450 Panama City
  - Includes a small portion of Georgia near Tallahassee
- 452 Jacksonville
- 454 Gainesville
- 456 Daytona Beach
- 458 Orlando
- 460 Southeast Florida
- 939 Fort Myers
- 952 Tampa
- 953 Tallahassee
- Florida is a special case in which state regulators have also assigned 5-digit LATA codes which overlay the Federally-assigned 3-digit LATAs. See map on the right for details. Some carriers refer to these by the 3-digit LATA, others by the 5-digit.

==== Georgia ====
- 438 Atlanta
  - Includes portion of Alabama from Oakland to Huguley
  - Includes Phenix City, Alabama
  - Includes Ranburne, Alabama
- 440 Savannah
  - Includes part of southern South Carolina as far north as Hardeeville and Hilton Head Island
- 442 Augusta
  - Includes Aiken County and Edgefield County, South Carolina
- 444 Albany
- 446 Macon

==== Hawaii ====
- 834

==== Idaho ====
- 652 Southern Idaho
  - Includes Malheur County, Oregon, especially the Ontario area
  - Includes Jackpot, Jarbidge, and Owyhee, Nevada
  - Includes Alta and Border, Wyoming
- 960 Coeur d'Alene
  - Includes part of northwest Montana as far east as Eureka and as far south as Libby
  - Includes Pullman, Washington and surrounding area
  - Includes Pend Oreille County, Washington

==== Illinois ====
- 358 Chicago
  - Includes Lake County and Newton County, Indiana, especially the Gary, Indiana area
  - Includes Demotte, Hebron, and Lakes of the Four Seasons, Indiana
  - Extends into Wisconsin Salem Township
- 360 Rockford
  - Extends into Wisconsin near Apple River, Illinois
- 362 Cairo
- 364 Sterling
- 366 Forrest
- 368 Peoria
- 370 Champaign
  - May include areas of Indiana near Danville, Illinois
- 374 Springfield
- 376 Quincy
- 976 Mattoon
- 977 Macomb
- 978 Olney

==== Indiana ====
- 330 Evansville
- 332 South Bend
- 334 Auburn-Huntington
- 336 Indianapolis
  - Extends into Illinois near Dana, Indiana
- 338 Bloomington
- 937 Richmond
  - Includes Union City, Ohio
- 938 Terre Haute
  - Includes Edgar and Clark counties of Illinois
  - May include Robinson, Illinois

==== Iowa ====
- 630 Sioux City
  - Extends into Minnesota near incorporated areas of Iowa along its length
  - Includes the eastern portions of Dakota and Thurston counties of Nebraska
  - Includes North Sioux City, South Dakota, and extends into South Dakota near Akron and Hawarden, Iowa
- 632 Des Moines
  - Extends into Missouri from Andover, Missouri to south of Davis City, Iowa
- 634 Davenport
  - Includes portion of Illinois as far as Geneseo and Aledo
  - Includes the Galena, Illinois area
- 635 Cedar Rapids

==== Kansas ====
- 524 Kansas City (see Missouri for details)
- 532 Wichita
- 534 Topeka

==== Kentucky ====
- 462 Louisville
  - Includes the central southern area of Indiana around Salem
- 464 Owensboro
- 466 Winchester

==== Louisiana ====
- 492 Baton Rouge
- 486 Shreveport
- 488 Lafayette
- 490 New Orleans

==== Maine ====
- 120

==== Maryland ====
- 236 see Washington, D.C.; most of this LATA is actually in Maryland
- 238 Baltimore
- 240 Hagerstown
  - Includes the easternmost part of West Virginia around Martinsburg as far as Route 9
  - Includes the northwestern part of the Eastern Panhandle of West Virginia including Keyser, from Grant County to Short Gap
  - Includes area of Pennsylvania just north of Hancock, Maryland
- 242 Salisbury

==== Massachusetts ====
- 126 Western Massachusetts
- 128 Eastern Massachusetts

==== Michigan ====
- 340 Detroit
- 342 Upper Peninsula of Michigan
  - Includes portion of Wisconsin around Iron Mountain, Michigan as far as Rhinelander and Townsend, Wisconsin
- 344 Saginaw
- 346 Lansing
- 348 Grand Rapids

==== Minnesota ====
- 620 Rochester
- 624 Duluth
- 626 St. Cloud
- 628 Minneapolis
- 636 Brainerd, Minnesota–Fargo, North Dakota

==== Mississippi ====
- 482 Jackson
  - Includes parts of Alabama around Columbus, Mississippi
- 484 Biloxi

==== Missouri ====
- 520 St. Louis
  - Includes part of south-central Illinois southwest of Springfield.
- 521 Westphalia (per locallingguide.com, includes Columbia MO)
- 522 Springfield
- 524 Kansas City
  - Includes eastern portion of Kansas as far out as U.S. 73 and U.S. 59 and south as far as U.S. 54
- 521 Central Missouri: Columbia and surrounding areas

==== Montana ====
- 648 Great Falls
- 650 Billings
- 963 Kalispell (historical)
  - note: LATA 963 appears on many LATA lists, and at least one map, but is no longer a separate LATA-equivalent area. It is now part of LATA 648.

==== Nebraska ====
- 644 Omaha
- 646 Grand Island
- 958 Lincoln

==== Nevada ====
- 720 Reno
  - May include Alpine, Verdi and Coleville, California
- 721 Pahrump

==== New Hampshire ====
- 122
  - Includes part of Vermont around Groton
  - Includes part of Maine around Kittery and Wilsons Mills

==== New Jersey ====
- 220 Atlantic Coastal New Jersey
- 222 Delaware Valley
- 224 North Jersey

==== New Mexico ====
- 664

==== New York ====
- 132 New York City and surrounding metropolitan area
  - Includes Greenwich, Connecticut
- 133 Poughkeepsie
  - Includes Milford, Pennsylvania and surrounding area
- 134 Albany
  - Includes Hancock, Massachusetts
- 136 Syracuse
- 138 Binghamton
  - Includes Sayre, Pennsylvania and surrounding area
- 140 Buffalo
  - Includes Ulysses, Pennsylvania and surrounding area
- 921 Fishers Island
- 974 Rochester

==== North Carolina ====
- 420 Asheville
- 422 Charlotte
  - Includes York County and Lancaster County, South Carolina
- 424 Greensboro-Winston-Salem area
- 426 Raleigh
- 428 Wilmington
- 949 Fayetteville
- 951 Rocky Mount

==== North Dakota ====
- 636 Brainerd, Minnesota–Fargo, North Dakota
- 638 Bismarck
  - Includes portions of Montana near Beach and Homesteaders Gap, North Dakota

==== Ohio ====
- 320 Cleveland
- 322 Youngstown
- 324 Columbus
- 325 Akron
- 326 Toledo
- 328 Dayton
- 922 Cincinnati
  - Includes Rising Sun, Indiana and surrounding area
  - Includes the northern tip of Kentucky as far south as Williamstown
- 923 Lima-Mansfield

==== Oklahoma ====
- 536 Oklahoma City
- 538 Tulsa

==== Oregon ====
- 670 Eugene
  - Includes New Pine Creek, California
- 672 Portland
  - Includes Southwestern Washington from Willapa Bay to Goldendale

==== Pennsylvania ====
- 226 Harrisburg
- 228 Philadelphia
- 230 Altoona
- 232 Wilkes-Barre/Scranton
- 234 Pittsburgh
- 924 Erie

==== Rhode Island ====
- 130 Rhode Island

==== South Carolina ====
- 430 Greenville
  - Includes Polk County, North Carolina
- 432 Florence
- 434 Columbia
- 436 Charleston

==== South Dakota ====
- 640

==== Tennessee ====
- 468 Memphis
  - Includes part of Mississippi from south of Memphis to as far south as Hernando
- 470 Nashville
- 472 Chattanooga
  - Includes northwestern tip of Georgia
- 474 Knoxville
- 956 Bristol-Kingsport-Johnson City
  - Includes part of Virginia from Abingdon to Wytheville

==== Texas ====
- 540 El Paso
- 542 Midland
- 544 Lubbock
- 546 Amarillo
  - Includes the southern half of the Oklahoma Panhandle
- 548 Wichita Falls
- 550 Abilene
- 552 Dallas
- 554 Longview, Kilgore
  - Includes Miller County, Arkansas
- 556 Waco
- 558 Austin
- 560 Houston
- 562 Beaumont
- 564 Corpus Christi
- 566 San Antonio
- 568 Brownsville
- 570 Hearne
- 961 San Angelo

==== Utah ====
- 660 Utah
  - May include Mesquite and Partoun, Nevada
  - May include Fredonia and Colorado City, Arizona
- 981 Navajo Nation (Utah portion)

==== Vermont ====
- 124 Vermont
  - Includes West Lebanon and West Chesterfield, New Hampshire

==== Virginia ====
- 236 Arlington, Fairfax, Prince William, and Stafford counties, and enclosed cities. See Washington, D.C.
- 244 Roanoke
- 246 Culpeper
- 248 Richmond
- 250 Lynchburg
- 252 Norfolk
- 927 Harrisonburg
- 928 Charlottesville
- 929 Edinburg
- 932 (Shared with WV)

==== Washington ====
- 674 Seattle
- 676 Spokane
  - Includes parts of Oregon including Milton-Freewater and Flora-Troy
  - Includes a section of Idaho from Lewiston to Grangeville, up to Troy, and Elk City
  - Includes Tensed, Idaho

==== West Virginia ====
- 254 Charleston
- 256 Clarksburg
- 240 Martinsburg
- 932 (overlap with VA)

==== Wisconsin ====
- 350 Northeast Wisconsin
  - Includes the southern corner of Michigan's Upper Peninsula
- 352 Northwest Wisconsin
- 354 Southwest Wisconsin
- 356 Southeast Wisconsin

==== Wyoming ====
- 654 Wyoming

=== U.S. territory LATAs ===
- American Samoa - 884
- Guam - 871
- Northern Mariana Islands - 870
- Puerto Rico - 820
- U.S. Virgin Islands - 822
- Wake Island - 836

=== Non-U.S. LATAs (non-regulatory) ===
- Mexico - 838
- Bahamas - 824
- Jamaica - 826
- Dominican Republic - 828
- Other Caribbean - 830
- Canada - 888

== Canada ==
As LATAs exist for US regulatory purposes, where they serve as a demarcation between intra-LATA calls (handled by regional Bell operating companies) and inter-LATA calls (handled by interstate long-distance carriers such as AT&T), they have no legal significance in Canada.

As of 2000, all of Canada (except for non-geographic numbers) is identified as LATA 888.

The use of this LATA set to identify individual provinces is therefore deprecated:

- Alberta - 881, 884
- British Columbia - 886
- Manitoba - 888
- New Brunswick - 890
- Newfoundland - 885
- Nova Scotia/P.E.I. - 887, 889
- Ontario - 851
- Quebec - 850, 883
- Saskatchewan - 891
- Yukon Territory - 892

=== Local interconnection region ===
Canada does define local interconnection regions (LIR's), which determine where points of interconnection (POI) must be provided by competing local exchange and mobile carriers to provide local number portability. A Canadian LIR is geographically smaller than a US LATA, typically comparable in size to a small city's flat-rate local calling area or to an entire large regional municipality. In areas where a small-city Digital Multiplex System controls a group of remote switching centres, one for each surrounding village, the local interconnect region normally includes each exchange in the city plus all downstream remotes of those exchanges. In a Toronto-sized city, the LIR will include only the city itself.

While the LIRs resemble local calling areas in geographic size, there are some key differences:

- LIR's normally do not include incumbent local independent telephone company exchanges in locations not opened to competition, where the independent numbers are currently not portable.
- LIR's do not cross provincial boundaries. Lloydminster has an LIR for each province, as does Ottawa-Hull.
- LIR's closely follow network topology, which often does not match a local flat-rate calling area as local calling is defined by arbitrary regulatory constructs.

Example: The tiny unincorporated village of Beebe Plain, divided by the Quebec-Vermont border, is served by +1-819-876 Rock Island, Quebec, Canada (a remote station controlled from Magog) and +1-802-873 Derby Line, Vermont, USA (a remote station controlled from St. Johnsbury). Magog and St. Johnsbury are both a long-distance call from anywhere in Beebe Plain, even though Canadian subscribers can place local calls to Sherbrooke, US subscribers can locally call Newport and an international call within the village is local. An LIR assignment which follows network topology places the Canadian remote station in Magog's LIR, not Sherbrooke's LIR.

== See also ==
- Local Exchange Routing Guide
