= Number translation service =

Function of the UK telephone network

A Number Translation Service (NTS) in the UK translates dialed non-geographic numbers, typically beginning with 08, to geographic numbers starting with 01 or 02. This allows organizations to maintain a consistent public phone number while directing calls to different destinations as needed.

Originally, NTS numbers enabled callers to dial a local number to reach a party regardless of their actual location, potentially reducing call costs. However, over time, the perception shifted, and many phone companies began charging higher rates for calls to 08 numbers compared to standard geographic numbers (01 or 02). For example, calls to 0845 and 0870 numbers can be more expensive than calls to 01, 02, or 03 numbers.
