= Somos, Inc. =

Telecommunications services provider

Somos, Inc., formerly SMS/800 Inc., is an American corporation that provides telecommunication network managing services. Since January 1, 2019, the company has provided the function of the North American Numbering Plan Administrator, under a contract granted by the Federal Communications Commission.

Somos administers the assignment of toll-free telephone numbers in the North American Numbering Plan (NANP) This company has been designated by the Federal Communications Commission (FCC) to administer the Service Management System (SMS) Database for Responsible Organizations (Resp Orgs) and service control points (SCPs), as defined by the Code of Federal Regulations (CFRs) Part 52 Section 101, and stipulated in 800 Service Management System (SMS/800) Functions Tariff - FCC No. 1.

Somos operates various web interfaces over a virtual private network for Resp Orgs to register toll-free telephone numbers. Somos admits and registers Resp Orgs according to qualification criteria including a required exam. It provides training materials and education in the U.S.

== History ==
Toll-free telephone service is a telecommunication service in which subscribers are assigned telephone number in NPAs 800, 888, 877, 866, 855, 844, and 833. Calls to these numbers incur no toll charges for callers.

The American Telephone & Telegraph Company (AT&T) first introduced 800 toll-free service in 1967. When AT&T was the only Interexchange carrier, local exchange carriers automatically routed all toll-free calls directly to an AT&T point of presence without performing a translation from the toll-free number to the terminating telephone number. The LECs routed the calls to AT&T based on the first three digits (800) of the dialed number. AT&T then performed all number translations and service area validation screenings.

- In 1981, AT&T introduced its Common Channel Interoffice Signaling (CCIS) network and the Network Services System (NSS) database for providing its own centralized facility for toll-Free number translation and service provisioning .
- In 1989, an FCC order (as part of Docket 86-10) found that a national database system for toll-free access would offer both advantages and disadvantages as compared with the NXX Plan access solution. The major advantage of the national database system was that it would enable toll-free number portability and thus facilitate competition since a customer could change carriers without changing numbers. Its drawback was that it would increase access time for toll-free calls until Signaling System 7 (SS7) deployment became more extensive.
- Following a review of the petitions for reconsideration and several developments involving SS7 deployment, on August 1, 1991, the FCC adopted a comprehensive order, which mandated the implementation of toll-free database access by March 4, 1993. A subsequent FCC order moved the actual cutover date to May 1, 1993.
- On February 10, 1993, the FCC released an order, which declared access to the toll-free database by Responsible Organizations (Resp Orgs) to be a Title II common carrier service and required the BOCs to file a tariff for toll-free database access by March 5, 1993. The effective date of the tariff was May 1, 1993. The order also set forth that any entity that met appropriate financial and technical eligibility requirements could serve as the Resp Org for a toll-free number record at the customer's request. With this provision, users could serve as their own Resp Org or they could use an IC, a LEC, or a third party as a Resp Org.
- On May 1, 1993, the management and assignment of toll-free numbers transitioned from the interim 800 NXX Plan to a 10 digit management plan in the national 800 Service Management System (SMS/800).
- On January 25, 1995, INC designated the 888 Numbering Plan Area (NPA) code as the next area code for use in providing toll-free service. The INC also reserved the remaining 8YY [sic] (877, 866, ..., 822) area codes for future toll-free services.
- On March 1, 1996, the 888 code was opened.
- On April 5, 1998, the 877 code was opened.
- On July 29, 2000, the 866 code was opened.
- On October 10, 2010, the 855 code was opened.
- On November 1, 2013, via FCC Order, SMS/800, Inc., assumed tariffing authority and responsibility for the SMS/800 platform services as well as approval for a plan to change its membership and governance structure to be more representative of the community of toll-free users, and to make other changes to the administration of the SMS/800 platform.
- On December 7, 2013, the 844 code was opened.
- In 2014, SMS/800, Inc., formed a new board of directors, ushering in a new chapter for the company, and the toll-free Industry as a whole.
- On July 1, 2015, SMS/800, Inc., launched the Texting & Smart Services (TSS) Registry for top-level routing data for toll-free messaging and multimedia services.
- On October 27, 2015, SMS/800, Inc., became known as Somos, Inc. The company has offices in Herndon, Virginia, and Bridgewater, New Jersey, and opened an office in Westford, Massachusetts, in 2016.
- On April 4, 2016, the Enhanced SMS/800 platform was launched to provide functionality for Resp Orgs.
- On June 3, 2017, the 833 code was opened.
- On January 1, 2019, Somos, Inc., became a North American Numbering Plan Administrator, under a new contract granted by the Federal Communications Commission.
- On June 29, 2021, Somos acquires XConnect.

== See also ==
- Toll-free telephone numbers in the United States
- Vanity numbering and phonewords
- Toll-free number portability
