= Shared-cost service =

Method of telephone call billing

Shared-cost service is a type of telephone call billing where the charge for calling a particular telephone number is split between the caller and the called party. Typically, the caller is charged the equivalent of a local call rate while the called party is charged the added costs of long-distance calling.

Often, telephone numbering plans include a dedicated number range assigned to shared-cost services – so called shared-cost telephone numbers.

== See also ==
- Universal International Shared Cost Number, an international shared-cost numbering scheme
- Toll-free telephone number, a type of billing where the entire call cost is charged to the called party
