= Vanity number =

Kind of telephone number

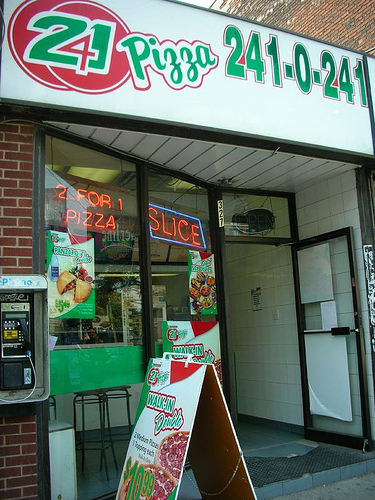
A vanity number using 2-4-1 as "two for the price of one".

A vanity number is a local or free-to-call telephone number for which a subscriber requests an easily remembered sequence of numbers for marketing purposes.

While many of these are phonewords (such as 1-800-Flowers, 313-DETROIT, 1-800-Taxicab or 1-800-Battery), occasionally all-numeric vanity phone numbers are used.

Numbers ending with repeated digits (such as -1111) are heavily advertised by taxi and food delivery companies; the Pizza Pizza chain has trademarked 967-1111, a Toronto local number. A memorable repeated sequence is also valuable to hotel chain franchisors such as Super 8 Motels, which advertises 1-800-800-8000.

A broadcaster may match a local telephone number to a station frequency (an AM 1010 radio call-in programme may use 872-1010 or a TV channel 13 studio may adopt 224-13-13.). An eye clinic may choose a number terminating in 20/20.

Other possible numeric indicators which convey specific meanings are 24/7 (twenty-four hours a day, seven days a week) or 2-4-1 (two for the price of one); the latter is used by 241 Pizza by advertising local number 241-0-241 or a variant.

== See also ==
- Phoneword
- SMS/800 and RespOrg and Toll-free telephone number#Vanity numbering
- Vanity domain
- Vanity plate
