= RespOrg =

Telephone registry company

A RespOrg, or responsible organization, is a company that maintains the registration for individual toll-free telephone numbers in the North American Numbering Plan by means of the distributed Service Management System/800 database.

RespOrgs were established in 1993 as part of a Federal Communications Commission order instituting toll-free number portability. A RespOrg (pronounced as though it were a single word, something like "ressporg") can be a long-distance company, reseller, end user or an independent that offers an outsourced service.

== Operation ==
The initial implementation of toll-free calling was primitive. In the 1950s, a collect call or a call to a Zenith number had to be completed manually by a telephone operator. By 1967, a direct-dial 1-800-number could be provided using Wide Area Telephone Service (WATS), but each prefix was tied to a specific geographic destination and each number was installed with special fixed-rate trunks which were priced beyond the reach of most small businesses. There was no means to select between rival carriers and little room for vanity numbering; a subscriber would need three separate numbers to be reachable from Canada, US interstate and US intrastate.

A "data base communication call processing method" patented by Roy P. Weber of Bell Labs, and implemented by AT&T in 1982, broke the link between individual telephone numbers and a specific trunk, city, or carrier. A toll-free number was merely an index into a large, distributed database; any number could be reassigned geographically anywhere by changing its database record. A call could be routed to one of multiple locations based on the call origin, load balancing between multiple call centers, times, or days. While this data was originally maintained by telephone companies, the breakup of the Bell System in the 1980s and the introduction of toll-free number portability in 1993 required an independent operator to maintain the SMS/800 database.

If the Service Management System were a central registry that controlled routing on all toll-free and other telephone numbers, the RespOrgs would be its registrars. Many RespOrgs are telephone companies or long-distance carriers; a toll-free number provided by a carrier is bundled with RespOrg service adequate to send all calls through that one carrier to a single local destination number.

A large subscriber with more complex requirements could use an independent RespOrg to direct calls for an individual number to multiple carriers for least-cost routing or to provide disaster recovery. A number that reaches multiple call centers via multiple carriers can be configured to avoid any single point of failure; any change to a number's routing can be propagated throughout the network in fifteen minutes. An independent RespOrg may also hold an advantage in obtaining vanity phonewords by reserving recently disconnected numbers for its clients in the first few seconds after they become available.

The function of RespOrgs in North American telephony is analogous to that of an individual registrar in the Internet's Domain Name System.

== Regulatory framework ==
Every toll-free telephone number is managed individually by a RespOrg. There are approximately 350 RespOrg services, ranging in size from large incumbent local exchange carriers (ILECs) to small companies that control only a few numbers. All RespOrgs operate under the same tariff and are required to follow specific guidelines for this process. The guidelines are maintained by a national industry group known as the SMS/800 Number Administration Committee (SNAC), a committee of the Alliance for Telecommunications Industry Solutions. Membership is open to any RespOrg.

In the United States, according to the regulations of the Federal Communications Commission, the end-user has the right to select a RespOrg and have their numbers transferred to their control. This process is called "porting" or "change of RespOrg" and requires a signed letter of authorization from the end-user.

In theory, regulations prevent hoarding, brokering and warehousing of numbers by both RespOrgs and subscribers. In practice, some RespOrgs do abuse the system by stockpiling millions of toll-free numbers for advertising purposes, because the enforcement of the regulations has been weak and sporadic. This situation has led to periodic creation of overlay plan toll-free area codes to prevent exhaustion of the SMS/800 available number pool.

== See also ==
- Toll-free telephone numbers in the United States
