= LERG Routing Guide =

Database of telecommunications

The Local Exchange Routing Guide (LERG) is a database of telecommunications numbering resources for use in the administration and operation of the North American Numbering Plan (NANP) by the NANP administrator (NANPA) and telecommunications service providers. This data supports the local exchange network of the NANP and identifies planning changes in the network.

The database has been maintained by private sector entities assigned by the Federal Communications Commission (FCC) to perform the NANPA function.

The database is produced in the TruOps Telecom Routing Administration (TRA) product group of iconectiv, LLC, formerly named Telcordia, a division of Ericsson since 2012.

== Content and purpose ==
The LERG provides data to support the routing of telephone calls by service providers in the public switched telephone network (PSTN) and the interconnection points of the PSTN with Internet Protocol (IP) networks.

== See also ==
- Routing in the PSTN
