= Toll-free telephone number =

Telephone number with no cost to its caller

A toll-free telephone number or freephone number is a telephone number that is billed for all arriving calls. For the calling party, a call to a toll-free number is free of charge, unless air-charges apply for mobile telephone service. A toll-free number is identified by a dialing prefix similar to an area code. The specific service access varies by country.

== History ==
The features of toll-free services have evolved as telephone networks have evolved from electro-mechanical call switching to computerized stored program controlled networks.

Originally, before the automatic system was developed, a call billed to the called party had to be placed through a telephone company operator as a collect call, often long-distance. The operator had to secure acceptance of the charges at the destination number, or even transfer that decision to a long-distance operator, before manually completing the call.

Some large businesses and government offices received large numbers of collect calls, which proved time-consuming for operators and the callers.

=== Manual toll-free systems ===
Prior to the development of customer-dialed toll-free service many telephone companies provided the service by operator assistance for telephone subscribers without dial telephones (manual service).

Operator-assisted toll-free calling included the Zenith number service introduced in the 1930s in the U.S. and Canada, as well as the manual 'Freephone' service introduced by the British Post Office in 1960.

Both systems were similar in concept. The calling party would ring the operator (now '100' in the UK, '0' in Canada/U.S.) and ask for a specific free number. In the U.S., the caller would ask for a number like "Zenith 12345" (some areas used "Enterprise" or "WX" instead of "Zenith"). In the UK, the caller would ask the operator to ring "Freephone" and a name or number (such as "Freephone Crimebusters" to pass on tips about a crime to the constabulary).

In either case, the operator would look up the corresponding geographic number from a list and place the call with charges reversed.

A Zenith number was typically available from a predefined area, anything from a few nearby cities to a province or state, and was listed in local directories in each community from which the subscriber was willing to accept the charges for inbound calls.

Until the introduction of InWATS toll-free service by the Bell System on May 2, 1967 and the Linkline (later "Freefone") 0800 services by British Telecom on 12 November 1985, manually ringing the operator was the standard means to place a toll-free call. More than a few established manual "Freephone" or "Zenith" numbers remained in use for many years after competing automated systems (0800 in UK, 1‑800 in U.S.) were deployed in parallel for new toll-free numbers.

=== Initial direct-dial systems ===
An automated toll-free service was introduced by AT&T in 1966 (US intrastate) and 1967 (US interstate) as an alternative to operator-assisted collect calling and manual "Zenith" or "Enterprise" numbers. This Inward Wide Area Telephone Service (InWATS) allowed calls to be made directly from anywhere in a predefined area by dialling the prefix 1‑800- and a seven-digit number.

The system initially provided no support for Automatic Number Identification and no itemised record of calls, instead requiring subscribers to obtain expensive fixed-rate lines which included some number of hours of inbound calling from a "band" of one or several U.S. states or Canadian provinces. Early InWATS 800 calling lacked the complex routing features offered with modern toll-free service. After competitive carriers were allowed to compete with AT&T in establishing toll-free service, the three digit exchange following the 800 prefix was linked to a specific destination carrier and area code; the number itself corresponded to specific telephone switching offices and trunk groups. All calls went to one central destination; there was no means to place a toll-free call to another country.

Despite its limitations (and the relatively high cost of long distance in that era), the system was adequate for the needs of large volume users such as hotel chains, airlines and rental car firms which used it to build a truly national presence.

For small regional businesses who received few long-distance calls, the original InWATS was prohibitively expensive. As a fixed-rate bulk service requiring special trunks, it was suited only to large volume users.

=== Modern direct-dial systems ===
Modern toll-free service became possible when telephone companies replaced their electro-mechanical switching systems with computerized switching systems. This allowed toll-free calls to be routed based on instructions located in central databases.

In the United States, AT&T engineer Roy P. Weber from Bridgewater, New Jersey patented a 'Data Base Communication Call Processing Method' which was deployed by AT&T in 1982. The called number was an index into a database, allowing a 'Toll-Free Call' or '800 Call' to be directed anywhere. This feature and other advances that made it possible were what led to AT&T marketing analyst Dodge Cepeda from Bedminster, New Jersey to propose the introduction of providing 800 Toll-Free Service to small and medium-size business customers on a nationwide basis. Once this service was implemented, it became possible for the very smallest of business operations to have potential customers contact them free of charge at a time when long-distance calling was expensive. Until this time, 800 Service was only available to major Fortune 500 companies.

In the United Kingdom, BT introduced "Linkline" on 12 November 1985. No more need to manually ring the operator, two new prefixes 0800 (an automated toll-free service which became "Freefone") and 0345 (a shared-cost service marketed as "Lo-Call" because initially its rates resembled those of local calls) could be reached by direct dial. Cable and Wireless used 0500 and 0645, in much the same way, just a few years later.

== Vanity numbering ==
A toll-free vanity number, custom toll-free number, or mnemonic is easy to remember; it spells and means something or it contains an easily recognized numeric pattern. An easily remembered number is valued as a branding and direct response tool in business advertising.

In the United States, Federal Communications Commission regulations mandate that numbers be allocated on a first come, first served basis; this gives vanity number operators who register as RespOrgs a strong advantage in obtaining the most valuable phonewords, as they have first access to newly disconnected numbers and to newly introduced toll-free area codes. In Australia, premium numbers, such as the 13-series or the vanity phone words, are distributed by auction separately from the administrative procedure to assign random, generic numbers from the available pool.

=== Shared use ===
In toll-free telephony, a shared-use number is a vanity number (usually a valuable generic phone word), which is rented to multiple local companies in the same line of business in different cities. These appear in Australia (1300 and 1800) and North America (1‑800, etc.); in the U.S., the RespOrg infrastructure is used to direct calls for the same number to different vendors based on the area code of the calling number.

As one example, a taxi company could rent shared use of 1‑800‑TAXICAB in one city. The number belongs to a company in Van Nuys, California, but is redirected to local cab companies on a city-by-city basis and promoted by being printed on everything from individual taxi cab hub caps to campaigns against drunk driving. Another example is Mark Russell's 1‑800‑GREATRATE, a shared-use number rented to lenders in various cities nationwide for a monthly fee.

One former Mercedes dealer obtained 1‑800‑MERCEDES, charging other dealers to receive calls to that number from their local areas. The automaker unsuccessfully sued MBZ Communications of Owatonna, Minnesota, operated by former Mercedes dealer Donald Bloom, alleging deception and trademark infringement. Mercedes was ultimately forced to obtain a different number, 1-800-FOR-MERCEDES.

A company renting 1‑800‑RED‑CROSS at a premium price to individual local Red Cross chapters as "shared use" was less fortunate; the Federal Communications Commission reassigned that number to the American Red Cross as an emergency response to Hurricane Katrina in 2005.

Shared use can be used as a means to circumvent FCC regulations against "warehousing, hoarding and brokering" toll-free numbers as technically the number is not being sold, only rented one city or region at a time. The practice is nonetheless potentially problematic as it leaves local businesses advertising numbers which they do not own and for which they therefore have no number portability. The cost per minute and per month is typically far higher for a shared-use number than for a standard toll-free vanity number which a local business controls outright, and there is little protection if the shared use company fails to meet its obligations or ceases operation.

There are also technical limitations; voice over IP users in particular are difficult to geolocate as their calls may be gated to the public switched telephone network at a point hundreds or thousands of miles away from their actual location. A roaming mobile or Internet telephone user is effectively (like the user of a foreign exchange line) attached to a distant rate centre far from their physical address.

If a program like Crime Stoppers is inherently regional or local, but its national 1‑800‑222‑TIPS number is shared between multiple exchanges, the exchange accepting the call must determine whether the call belongs to some other region.

== International implementations ==
The implementation of toll-free calling by assigning special telephone numbers for charging a destination party is implemented in many countries by various dialing prefixes in the local number plan.

- In Argentina, the prefix for toll-free numbers is "0800", followed by seven digits (the first three of them are fixed for each operator, so the user may know which carrier is serving the party they are calling). These numbers are called "0‑800" (cero ochocientos) or líneas gratuitas (free lines). There is also a local-rate service named "0-810" (cero ochocientos diez) where the calling party pays the fee for a local call and the called party pays for the long-distance fees.
- In Armenia, the toll-free prefix is "800" followed by a five-digit number.
- In Australia, the toll-free prefix is "1800" followed by a six-digit number. Calls are free from any landline and generally free from mobiles, although some mobile providers may charge their own fee. A fixed-cost fee (usually the cost of a local call) is payable by the caller to "1300" and "13" prefix numbers (followed by six and four digits respectively).
- In Austria, the prefix for toll-free numbers is also "0800", but only followed by six digits. They are commonly referred to as null-achthunderter Nummern (zero-eight hundred numbers).
- In Azerbaijan, the prefix for toll -free numbers is 088, followed with seven digits. Toll Free calls are available both from mobile and landline phone operators.
- In Belgium, the prefix "0800" is used for toll-free numbers, followed by 5 digits. They are commonly referred to as nul-achthonderd nummers (zero-eight hundred numbers) in Dutch, numéros verts (green numbers) in French or "null-achthunderter Nummern" (zero-eight hundred numbers) in the German speaking area.
- In Brazil, the toll-free prefix is "0800". Although regular landline numbers in Brazil are 8 digits long, the toll-free prefix is usually followed by 7 digits, with 6 digits formerly common. Toll-free numbers in Brazil can be accessed from any telephone (by default) within the country, with many exceptions. They can only be accessed from outside Brazil by using a calling service (such as voice-over-Internet services or MCI Worldcom calling service) that accesses numbers from within the called country. Many toll-free numbers are not available from cell phones (usually blocked by the cell phone provider rather than by the provider of the toll-free number, in an effort to prevent low-price competition from calling card providers). Some toll-free numbers are not available from phones listed by the owner of the number, including many payphones. There is no special name for the service and when such a number is advertised, there is usually a remark that the call is free.
- In Bulgaria, the toll-free prefix is "0800" followed by a five-digit number (up to now, only 1XXXX and 20ххх numbers have been allocated). These numbers are called Зелен номер (green number) by Vivacom and Зелена линия (green line) by A1.
- In Canada, toll-free numbers are drawn from the US SMS/800 database. A seven-digit number 310-xxxx (a true toll-free, can be called from anywhere in its home area code at local rates from certain, but not all, carriers) is available in Bell Canada and Telus territories. From a landline, these are free. From cell phones, airtime is not covered, but there are no long-distance charges.
- In Chile, the toll-free prefix is "800" followed by a six-digit number. These numbers are called número 800 (800 number). These numbers cannot be accessed from abroad.
- In Colombia, toll-free numbers start with "018000".
- In Croatia, the prefix for toll-free numbers is "0800".
- In the Czech Republic, the toll-free prefix is "800".
- In Denmark telephone-numbers have eight digits. The toll-free numbers all begin with "80" followed by six further digits.
- The Dominican Republic is assigned specific 1‑800 exchanges in the North American Numbering Plan; the 1-809-200-xxxx exchange is also free for domestic callers in that country.
- In Egypt, it starts with "0800" followed by a seven-digit number. Unavailable via cellphones.
- In Ecuador, it starts with "1800" followed by a 6-digit number. Some numbers have either regional or nationwide access. Calls from cellphones are only allowed by the operator Alegro which charges a few cents for these calls. PORTA and Movistar do not allow the service.
- In France the "0800" to "0805" prefixes are used for toll-free numbers. They are also known as numéros verts (green numbers).
- In Finland, the toll-free prefix is "0800".
- In Germany, the toll-free prefix is "'0800" followed by a seven-digit number. The "0801" prefix is already reserved for future use. The prefix used to be "0130". Deutsche Telekom calls these numbers "freecall 0800", most Germans refer to it simply as null-achthunderter Nummern (zero-eight hundred numbers).
- In Georgia, the prefix for toll-free numbers is 0800 followed with six digits. Toll-free calls are available both from mobile and landline phone operators.
- In Greece, the toll-free prefix is "800" followed by a seven-digit number or "807" followed by a four-digit number, used for phone card services only.
- In Hong Kong, toll-free numbers have the "800" prefix.
- In Hungary, toll-free numbers have the "80" prefix.
- In Iceland, the toll-free prefix is "800", followed by a four-digit number.
- In India, the toll-free prefix is "1800", followed by a six or seven digit number. They are free of charge if called from a mobile phone or a land line. The "1860" prefix followed by seven digits is used for local-rate numbers. The calling party pays the local rate and the called party pays long-distance call charges (if any).
- In Indonesia, the toll-free prefix is "0800-1", followed by a six-digit number.
- In Ireland, 1800-xxxxxx numbers are freephones, with the 1800 71xxxx reserved for services that expect unusually high volumes of calls (e.g. radio station phone-in lines).
- In Israel, toll-free numbers are prefixed with "1800" followed by 6 digits (for local businesses); "180" or "189" followed by 7 digits usually refers to a free call to an overseas-operated calling center. The called party pays the charges for the call. As of 2012, calls from local cellular phone service providers to these prefixes are also free. Numbers prefixed with "1700" followed by 6 digits are local-rate numbers for the first 3–4 minutes, after which the charges for the remaining duration of the call are transferred to the receiving party (on a "shared cost" basis).
- In Italy, toll-free numbers are dialed with the "800" or "803" prefix and are commonly referred to as numero verde (green number) or linea verde (green line). The numeri verdi used to begin with "1678" and later with "167" until 1999.

NTT Docomo Business trade mark for free dial, often used in print advertising.

- In Japan, the prefixes "0120" and "0800" are officially assigned for toll-free numbers and are often referred to as "free dial" (フリーダイヤル) or "free call" (フリーコール) telephone numbers. These numbers are owned by NTT Docomo Business. Several telephone carriers also provide toll-free services under their own company prefixes such as "0077" (these prefixes are also used for other toll services; the prefix "0570" is officially assigned for Navi Dial, a special toll service also operated by NTT Docomo Business).
- In South Korea, toll-free numbers are prefixed with "080" (not to be confused with "060" or "070", which are used for pay-per-call/pay-per-minute information services or digital home phone services). Not all numbers with the "080" prefix are toll-free when called from a mobile phone.
- In Latvia the prefix 8000-xx-xx is used for toll-free services. They are toll-free only when dialed from landlines, and charged the same as a land line when dialed from cell phones.
- In Malaysia the prefix is 1800. Free if calling from a land-line and VoIP only. Calling from mobile phone will be considered a local call, with varying charges depending on the mobile network providers.
- In Mexico the prefix is 800.
- In Nepal the prefix is 1660.
- In New Zealand, both "0800" or "0508" prefixes are referred to variously and interchangeably as "free phone" or "toll-free". Originally these "Oh-eight-hundred" numbers were provided by Spark New Zealand and "0508" by rival company Clear (now One NZ), although now both numbers can be provided by either company. Some older toll bar services designed to restrict toll calls (including long distance or calls to mobile phones) will also block calls to these free phone numbers, although this has become less common since the mid-1990s. A limited number of companies utilizing toll-free numbers will not accept calls from mobile phones. Some other free phone services exist, such as "*555" ("star five five five"), which can be dialled from cellular phones to report traffic conditions and incidents of dangerous driving.
- In the Netherlands, the prefix "0800" is used for toll-free numbers. Calling 0800-numbers from fixed and mobile phones is free by law. UIFN's "00800" are generally free from fixed lines and charged for the airtime from mobile phones. UIFN access is not enforced by law, causing certain phone providers not to honor the standard.
- In Norway most telephone-numbers have eight digits (with some exceptions). Toll-free numbers all begin with "800", followed by five further digits.
- In Pakistan, toll-free numbers have the format "0800-xxxxx".
- In Paraguay, the prefix "0800" is used for toll-free numbers, followed by 6 digits.
- In the Philippines, the prefix for toll-free numbers is "1800" followed by either one, two, or four digits (examples include 8, 10, and 1888), and then by either a four- or seven-digit phone number. However, there are restrictions. Toll-free numbers are limited to the telephone network where the toll-free number is being handled. So, subscribers of a different telephone network company will not be able to call a toll-free number handled by a different telephone network. International toll-free numbers can only be accessed if the calling party is a PLDT subscriber.
- In Poland, toll-free numbers have the format "800 xxx xxx". There are also split-charge numbers in the format "801 uxx xxx" (caller's cost depends on the digit u) and "universal numbers" in the format "804 uxx xxx", where the caller is automatically connected to the nearest office (these numbers are toll-free if u=3).
- In Portugal, the prefix is "800" so the 9-digit number is "800 xxx xxx". It is referred as chamada gratuita (free call) or as número verde (green number).
- In Qatar, toll-free numbers have the format "800' xxxx".
- In Romania, toll-free numbers have the format "0800 xxx xxx". The service is referred to as număr verde.
- In Russia, the prefix is "8-800", followed by 7 digits (8-800-XXX-XX-XX).
- In Serbia, the prefix "0-800", followed by a 6 or 7 digit number, is used.
- In Singapore, the prefix "1800" followed by a 7 digit number is used. Calling from a mobile phone network will be considered a local call and charges vary among service providers.
- In Slovakia, the toll-free prefix is "0800", followed by six digits. The local rate prefix is "0850".
- In Slovenia, the prefix "080" is used for toll-free numbers, followed by four more digits.
- In South Africa, the prefix "080", followed by 7 digits is used. It is referred to as a "toll-free" or "080" number (Afrikaans: tol-vrye).
- In Spain, the "900XXXXXX" or "800XXXXXX" numbers are always toll-free (800 numbers are not usually used), "909XXXXXX" is used for dial-up Internet service and toll-free dialup Internet service (under subscription). Also "1002", "1004", "14XX", "15XX" and "16XX" are free and are used for the telecommunication providers call centers.
- In Sweden, the prefix is "020" or "0200" for toll-free numbers. (Additionally, 0800 is reserved for future use.) These numbers are unreachable from other countries.
- In Switzerland, the toll-free prefix is "0800"; it used to be "155". These numbers are called grüne Nummer (German) / numéro vert (French) / numero verde (Italian), all meaning "green number".
- In Taiwan, the toll-free prefix is 0800-xxx-xxx or 0809-xxx-xxx, but not all Taiwanese mobile numbers can call toll free numbers. A toll-free subscriber can decide to restrict a number due to high per-minute mobile rates. This is cumbersome for the caller, who is told to dial another landline number, usually at the highest toll rate within the country as a mobile to landline call. Some small VOIP operators also cannot call toll free numbers. For example, 0701-xxx-xxx cannot call toll free numbers directly, but can call through a live operator by dialling "123" and have them redirect the call.
- In Thailand, for the Call Free, Free Call, Toll-Free, or Free Phone service, the format used is "1800-xxxxxx". Calls are free for all fixed line calls. Mobile carriers AIS and CAT (60+% of Thailand's subscribers) offer 1-800 service for cell phones. DTAC and True mobile providers currently do not, but it is expected they will offer the 1-800 service for subscribers by late 2009.
- In Turkey, the prefix for toll-free numbers is "0800".
- In the United Kingdom, modern freephone numbers start with 0800 or 0808, followed by a further 7 digits. Some older 0800 numbers still in use have a shorter number length. The former 0500 freephone number range was withdrawn on 5 June 2017.
- In Ukraine, toll-free numbers have the "0800" prefix, followed by 2 digits for the carrier code, then 4 digits for the client number - i.e., 0 800 YYXXXX. Before October 2009, the "8800" prefix was used.
- In Vietnam, the prefix "1800" followed by a series of numbers, usually from 4 to 9 digits. All "1800" numbers are free of charge, but some of them cannot be dialled from all telephones.
- In Kosovo, the toll-free prefix is "0800" followed by 5 digits.

=== Australia ===
==== Toll-free ====
- Toll-free numbers in Australia are ten-digit numbers beginning with the prefix "1800".
- 1800 numbers can also be found in Phonewords via an online auction.
- For all types, the recipient business pays for incoming toll charges, either per call or at flat rates.
- In some cases, 1800 numbers can be accessed from international lines.
- Callers to an 1800 number are not charged a connection fee from a domestic fixed line. Calls from a mobile phone may incur charges depending on the provider.
- The original prefix was 008. Such numbers were nine digits long. For example, the Crime Stoppers toll-free hotline was 008 333 000, sometimes (misleadingly) written as (008) 33 3000. Such numbers could be dialled from outside Australia, for example +61 08 333 0000

==== Local Rate numbers ====
A system similar to 1800 numbering exists where 6 or 10 digit numbers prefixed with 13 (one-three), 1300 or 1301 (colloquially one-three-hundred) can be called at local call rates regardless of the caller's location.

- Callers to a 13 number are charged a "connection fee" by their telephone provider.
- 13 and 1300 numbers are often "smart routed" to the local outlet of chain stores or fast food premises. They may also be used by different companies in different regions.
- 13 numbers, 1300 numbers and 1800 numbers are relocatable across Australia, and can be transferred between different telecommunications suppliers.
- 13 numbers are a premium number scheme, subject to charges from the Australian Communications & Media Authority (ACMA) of approximately $10,000 per annum collected by the supplying carrier.
- Premium numbers, such as those that spell a word using keypad letters, are regularly auctioned by the ACMA.

==== Mobile telephones ====
- Mobile callers are charged to phone a 1300 number or 1800 number, usually at their normal per minute rate, but sometimes at predatory rates. These expensive numbers can be decoded to ordinary landline and organisations usually offer a landline number on their websites, though it may be hard to find.
- Smart routed 1800 or 13(00) numbers are sometimes not available from mobile phones as owners of the numbers may bar incoming calls from mobile devices due to higher call charges associated with such calls.

=== Canada ===
In addition to NANP toll-free numbers, carriers Bell Canada and Telus offer 310- numbers that can be accessed at local-call prices as shared-cost service (free from landlines, incurs local airtime charge from mobiles and local price from payphones). There are a few special mobile-only numbers (like *CAA to call the Canadian Automobile Association) which are free from cell phones, these are actually vertical service codes.

=== China ===
- Calling an 800-number is free of charge. Calling a 400-number incurs a local access charge.
- 800-numbers are accessible only to land-line subscribers, while 400-numbers are accessible to all land-line and mobile users.

==== 800-toll-free numbers ====
800 toll-free numbers are commonly called "800 免费电话". The official name is "被叫集中付费业务" (called party collect paid service), which means the cost of the call is borne not by the caller but by the party receiving the call.

- 800-toll-free numbers in China are ten-digit numbers beginning with "800". There is no prefix before "800".
- 800-toll-free numbers are not accessible to mobile network subscribers and some land-line subscribers. For instance China Tietong Telecom land-line users cannot access 800 numbers.

==== 400-toll-free numbers ====
- 400-service is called "主被叫分摊付费业务" (calling party and called party split-paid service), which means the calling party pays for the local access fee and the called party pays the toll (long distance) fee.
- 400-toll-free numbers in China are ten-digit numbers beginning with "400".
- 400-toll-free numbers can be accessed by all fixed-line and mobile phones.
- Callers have to bear local access charges from their service providers.
- 400-toll-free numbers with prefix "4001" are international toll-free numbers which can be routed to destination numbers inside or outside China. 400 toll-free numbers with prefix "4000", "4006", "4007" or "4008" are national toll-free numbers which can be routed to China destination numbers only.

=== Netherlands ===
The introduction of 0800/0900 numbers in the Netherlands in 1986 has led to significant growth of call centres and an increase in outsourcing.

Originally, free telephone numbers in the Netherlands started with either the 06-0, 06-4 or 06-3000 prefix. Most 0800-numbers cannot be called from abroad, and only few can be called from the Caribbean Netherlands (by dialing 0031800). 088-numbers are shared-cost; from landlines, the caller pays only the costs for a local call, whereas the receiver pays the rest.

=== United Kingdom ===
In the United Kingdom, toll-free telephone numbers are generally known as "freephone" numbers (British Telecom numbers use the previously trademarked term Freefone) and begin with the prefixes 0800 or 0808. The most commonly used prefix is 0800, first used in November 1985. Additionally, numbers in the range 0808 80x xxxx are reserved for not-for-profit helplines, through a scheme negotiated by the Helplines Partnership (now known as the Helplines Association).

Since 1 July 2015, all 0800 and 0808 numbers have been free to call from landlines and mobile phones alike. Most mobile phone operators had charged for such calls previously, with Orange being the final major network to introduce such charges during December 2005. Certain helplines, such as those in the 0808 80x xxxx series had remained free from most networks on a voluntary basis and some niche operators, such as Giffgaff always offered freephone calls at no charge.

The UK mobile operators offer an alternative product to organisations who wish to provide toll-free services - 5-digit voice short codes which are sold through mobile aggregators.

0500 numbers, introduced by Mercury Communications (later known as Cable & Wireless, now Vodafone) in 1982, were also freephone numbers (known as "FreeCall"), but were officially withdrawn by Ofcom on 3 June 2017. A three-year transition period prior to that had allowed existing subscribers to migrate to matching 080 85 numbers with the same final 6 digits as before. While the numbers had been portable, the 0500 range had been closed to new allocations since 1997/98.

0500 numbers had six more digits after the prefix. 0800 numbers can have six or seven digits after the prefix. 0808 numbers have seven digits after the prefix.

Freephone numbers in the range 08081 570000 to 570999 are blocked out by Ofcom for use as fictitious telephone numbers.

=== United States ===
Toll-free numbers in the North American Numbering Plan (NANP) are commonly called "800-numbers" after the first area code assigned for the service. Today, several prefixes are used: 800 (since January 1, 1966), 888 (since March 1, 1996), 877 (since April 4, 1998), 866 (since July 29, 2000), 855 (since October 9, 2010), 844 (since December 7, 2013), and 833 (since June 3, 2017).

Area codes reserved for future expansion of the service include 822, 880 through 887, and 889.

The original Wide Area Telephone Service (WATS) is obsolete. North American toll-free numbers are controlled by an intelligent network database (SMS/800) in which any toll-free number may be directed to any geographic telephone number under the control of any of various RespOrgs. Direct inward dialing and toll-free number portability are supported; various providers offer gateways which receive free phone calls on PRI lines and deliver them to voice over IP or pager users.

Toll free numbers usually capture the telephone number of the caller for billing purposes through automatic number identification, which is independent of caller ID data and functions even if caller ID is blocked.

== Universal International Freephone Service ==
Universal International Freephone Service is an international service, assigned the country code 800 by the International Telecommunication Union. The intention is that any customer in the world can dial the same number to reach a business subscribing to a number, and at no charge to the calling party. However, only a limited number of countries participate. In order to participate, countries must agree on the amount of revenue they will retain (to cover their costs of network transport) while still forwarding sufficient revenue to cover the recipient's costs of subscribing.

A Universal International Freephone Number (UIFN) is a worldwide toll-free "800 number" issued by the International Telecommunication Union. Like the 800 area code issued for the North American Numbering Plan in the United States and Canada and 0800 numbers in many other countries, the call is free for the caller while the receiver pays the charges. UIFN uses country-level calling code 800 so that no matter where the caller is, only the international access code (IAC), the UIFN country code (800) and the 8-digit UIFN need to be dialed. As of March 2020, 144 carriers in 67 countries participate in the UIFN program; free access to the numbers (as international calls) from mobile and coin telephones is not universal. Registration of a +800 number incurs a 300 Swiss franc ITU fee (as of 2018) in addition to any charges levied by the individual carrier. The number must be activated for inbound calls from at least two telephone country codes within 180 days.

The +800 UIFN service is one of three ITU-administered non-geographic codes with a similar numbering scheme. The +808 Universal International Shared Cost Number (UISCN), billed at the price of a domestic call, shares the same eight-digit format; the +979 Universal International Premium Rate Number (UIPRN), billed at a high premium cost, carries one extra digit to indicate price range.

== See also ==
- SMS/800 and RespOrg
- 900 number
- Freepost
- Mobile dial code
- Wide Area Telephone Service
