= Telax Hosted Call Center =

Telax Hosted Call Center (Telax Voice Solutions Inc.)
- Trade name: Telax Hosted Call Center
- Native name: Telax Voice Solutions Inc.
- Formerly: Telax Systems Inc.
- Company type: Private (until acquisition)
- Industry: Cloud-based call center solutions, SaaS
- Founded: 1997
- Founder: Mario Perez
- Fate: Acquired by Intermedia Cloud Communications
- Successor: Intermedia Contact Center
- Area served: North America
- Key people: Mario Perez (Founder)
- Products: Telax Hosted Call Center (cloud-based call center software)
- Services: ACD, IVR, VoIP, Business Intelligence tools, social media integration for call centers
- Owner: Intermedia Cloud Communications (after acquisition)
- Parent: Intermedia Cloud Communications (after acquisition)

Telax Hosted Call Center, is the trading name of Telax Voice Solutions Inc., formerly Telax Systems Inc. A privately held application service provider delivering automatic call distribution (ACD), self-service IVR, business intelligence tools and VoIP services, to a network of enterprises, government organizations, ISPs and other service providers across North America. Telax deploys its products based on the software as a service (SaaS) model, providing on-demand service generally priced by per-seat license. Telax is also a GSA Multiple Award Schedule contractor providing indefinite delivery and indefinite quantity IDIQ through the IT Schedule 70.

Telax's flagship product and namesake, Telax Hosted Call Center, is a cloud-based call center software application offering call management, virtual queuing, unified messaging, screen pops, call recording and other functionalities such as platform neutral Metaswitch and CRM services, Microsoft Lync, and Microsoft Dynamics integration. Telax is the first Certified Metaswitch Partner to offer a call center platform with social media integration. The add-on delivers Facebook Fan page messages, Instant Messaging, and Twitter replies through skills-based routing (SBR) using the Telax Call Center Agent software. Skype support allows users of the Telax platform to route and manage incoming calls received from Skype IDs.

== History ==
Telax Voice Solutions Inc. was founded as Telax Systems Inc. by Mario Perez in 1997. In its early years, the company consulted on call center solutions for companies such as RBC, AT&T and Yak Communications Inc.

In April 2004, Telax Voice Solutions Inc. released Telax Hosted Call Center, a web-based call management solution targeted for private and public sector call center operators. Telax secured a contract with Industry Canada in 2005 and Health Canada in 2007. In July 2009, the U.S. General Services Administration renewed a contract with Telax for its Fleet Management Division.

On 29 September 2009, Telax released the latest version of Call Center Agent, the user component of Telax Hosted Call Center. The new version, Call Center Agent 9.2, was released in French, Spanish and English. On 15 October 2009, Telax announced it had successfully by-passed a restriction imposed by Salesforce.com developers to integrate its popular screen pop feature with any version of the web-based CRM application. Prior to the Telax workaround the function had only been available with premium editions of Salesforce.com's widely used CRM solution.

On 14 January 2010, Telax was certified as a Top 20% Performer based on the Past Performance Evaluation (PPE) survey responses of its reference customers. The Open Ratings survey was conducted by Dun & Bradstreet for GSA certification to compare customer satisfaction relative to similar companies.

On 23 February 2010, Telax announced that Metaswitch Networks certified Telax Hosted Call Center as interoperable with the Metaswitch solution. The certification was issued following Telax's successful completion of a series of interoperability tests with Metaswitch version 7.0 and Telax Hosted Call Center's ACD 10.3.0.0 SIP protocol.

On 21 September 2010, Telax launched the free 3.0 Add-on for Telax Hosted Call Center software. The 3.0 add-on allows for routing of social media messages from Facebook, Twitter, and other social media engines to Call Center Agent users. The add-on also features a social media dashboard for real-time reporting and media management. On 8 February 2011, Telax announced the release of a Skype expansion for the 3.0 add-on.

On 14 February 2011, Telax was awarded a Federal Supply Schedule contract making Telax an approved service vendor to all levels of government in the U.S. Telax is the first hosted call center solution provider to be listed on the GSA's Information Technology Schedule 70.

On August 12, 2019, Telax was acquired by Intermedia Cloud Communications. Telax Hosted Call Center has since been renamed Intermedia Contact Center.
