= Noble Systems Corporation =

- Company type: Private
- Founded: 1989
- Founder: Jim K. Noble, Jr.
- Fate: Merged with Aspect Software
- Successor: Alvaria
- Headquarters: Atlanta, Georgia, USA
- Website: www.noblesystems.com

Noble Systems Corporation (NSC) was a privately held company based in Atlanta, Georgia, which developed call center technology, including outbound dialing systems for collections and inbound call management systems for customer relationship management (CRM).

== Corporation history ==
Noble Systems Corporation, headquartered in Atlanta, Georgia, was established in 1989.

In November 2007, Noble Systems acquired Amcat, Amcat UK Ltd, and Amcat Germany GmbH. In 2009, Noble Systems acquired assets of the TouchStar Software Corporation, including the TouchStar brand and all intellectual properties, as well as TDI (formerly Teledirect) including the Liberation brand and product line and associated intellectual properties. This included the Digisoft line of products, including eTelescript.

In October 2011, Noble Systems acquired Open Wave, a Workforce Management (WFM) software and solutions specialist.

In March 2018, Noble Systems acquired FidoTrack, a provider of Cloud Gamification software and services for call centers.

In 2021, the company merged with Aspect Software to form Alvaria.

At the time of its merger, Noble Systems had about 500 employees globally, including regional U.S. offices and international offices in the UK, Australia, and the Philippines.

== Products ==
The flagship Noble Enterprise Solution suite consisted of hardware and software components for computer telephony and contact center management applications. Noble Systems provided products for predictive dialing, ACD, blended communications, custom scripting, on-screen reporting, agent monitoring, and resource management. Its products included omnichannel voice and non-voice (email, SMS, web), IVR, recording, workforce management and employee engagement, and robotic process automation (RPA) and artificial intelligence (AI) tools with data analytics and real-time and post-call speech analytics. The suite was offered in both premises-based and Communication as a service (CaaS) cloud configurations.
