= CT Connect =

Telephone call monitoring software

CT Connect is a software product that allows computer applications to monitor and control telephone calls. This monitoring and control is called computer-telephone integration, or CTI. CT Connect implements CTI by providing server software that supports the CTI link protocols used by a range of telephone systems, and client software that provides an application programming interface (API) for telephony functions.

CT Connect is used most frequently in call center applications. Large call centers must handle huge volumes of calls, and the coordination of calls with business applications is essential.

== Software Function and Structure ==
CT Connect software is not a CTI application in itself; rather, it is a software component that communicates with telephone systems, converts telephone call status and control information to a standardized form, and presents that information to third-party applications. This component approach contrasts with that of integrated offerings such as those from Genesys Telecommunications Laboratories that combine the low-level telephone interface function with higher-level application logic such as retrieving and displaying information from a data base.

Software developers seeking to include telephone-related functions in their applications incorporate CT Connect software modules into their projects. The CT Connect server module must be installed on a computer that has a special CTI communication link to the telephone system. The CT Connect client module is installed on the same computer as the developer's application software. The client module presents an API for application telephone functions such as dialing a new call or generating an alert for an incoming call. The client module executes these requests by signaling them to the server module, which in turn requests the function from the telephone system. The client-server structure allows multiple applications running on multiple computers to share access to a single telephone system.

== CTI Standards ==
The principal standards specification for CTI is ECMA Computer-supported Telecommunications Applications or CSTA. The CSTA standard specifies a call model (that is, how parties participate in a call and the steps a call goes through as it proceeds) and a set of messages that can be exchanged between a telephone system and a computer system. When both telephone systems and computer systems implement the CSTA standard, a customer can choose freely among competing products with confidence that they will interoperate.

As described more fully below, the CT Connect development team participated in the definition of CSTA. CT Connect and its predecessor, Digital Equipment's Computer Integrated Telephony product line, implement the CSTA call model and support the relevant CSTA protocol standards. Several telecommunications equipment vendors have used CT Connect as a laboratory CSTA reference to test their own products' compliance with the standard.

== Environment Independence ==
CTI servers like CT Connect must operate in a heterogeneous computing environment and must interoperate with other system components chosen by application developers and users. CT Connect takes an "open" stance towards other system components, interoperating with a wider range of components than other CTI servers. This open stance is undoubtedly one reason that CT Connect has survived for 20 years while other competitors such as IBM CallPath and Novell Telephony Services have been discontinued.

For CTI servers, important dimensions of interoperation are:

=== Telephone System Independence ===
Many telephone switch manufacturers have implemented CTI links for their products. Some of these are proprietary protocols and some are implementations of the ECMA CSTA standard. Some of these manufacturers also offer their own CTI servers (such as Nortel's Contact Center Manager Server), but those servers generally operate only with that single manufacturer's telephone system. By contrast, the companies that have owned and marketed CT Connect over the years (see the CT Connect history below) have made arrangements with most major PBX manufacturers to get access to their protocol specifications and implement their CTI link protocols.

=== API Independence ===
Computer-telephone APIs have proliferated. Microsoft introduced TAPI, Novell introduced TSAPI, Sun Microsystems introduced JTAPI, and a group of vendors formed the Versit Consortium to better integrate the existing protocol standards and APIs. Some manufacturers have attempted to use CTI API specifications to restrict users to their other products. For example, the Microsoft TAPI specification can be implemented only on the Microsoft Windows family of operating systems, and the Novel Telephony Services CTI server (now discontinued) could be used only on Novell networks. By contrast, CT Connect's client-server architecture permits client modules that offer various CTI APIs, and all client modules can interoperate with a common CTI server module.

=== Operating System Independence ===
Like CTI APIs (see above), most CTI servers operate under only one operating system. By contrast, CT Connect has historically included client and server modules that operate under a range of popular operating systems including the Unix and Microsoft Windows families.

== History ==
CT Connect has had a significant role in the conception and evolution of the CTI concept and its implementation. The product has been owned and marketed by three companies over its 20-year lifetime.

=== Digital Equipment Corporation ===
The software that eventually became CT Connect was originally developed in the late 1980s at Digital Equipment Corporation. During the 1980s, telephony was evolving from analog to digital technology. The international telecommunications standards body CCITT (now the ITU) published specifications for the Integrated Services Digital Network (ISDN). The ISDN specifications define digital interfaces between a subscriber and the network that can simultaneously support multiple telephone calls and packet data transmission.

In the 1980s Digital Equipment was a leader in computer networking with its DECnet software. Digital Equipment studied the ISDN specifications and concluded that the ISDN interface lacked the ability to coordinate a voice call with related data. The Digital Equipment team named this capability computer integrated telephony (or CIT) and evangelized the concept among vendors and customers. (The acronym for the original Digital Equipment product line, CIT, is frequently confused with the industry acronym for any form of computer-telephone integration, CTI. The latter term was adopted by members of the MultiMedia Telecommunications Association (MMTA), a prominent US industry association. The MMTA was incorporated into a larger trade association, TIA, in 2000.)

(See and for early expositions of the CTI concept by Digital Equipment.)

Digital Equipment needed the commercial cooperation of telecommunications equipment manufacturers because their telephone switching systems had to be modified to report telephone call information via new CTI data links. Two Canadian private branch exchange (PBX) manufacturers that were interested in the idea: Northern Telecom (now Nortel) and Mitel, which at that time was controlled by British Telecom. Digital Equipment worked with both of these companies – one in Canada and one in the United Kingdom – to design and implement CTI data links between their respective products. Both efforts were successful, and systems using PBXs from both companies were shown at the quadrennial CCITT exhibition in Geneva in the fall of 1987. Digital Equipment released its first CTI software products, operating with the Mitel SX-20 and Northern Telecom SL-1 PBXs, the following year.

Between 1988 and 1992, the Digital Equipment team approached more telecommunications equipment manufacturers (including Siemens ROLM and the former AT&T, whose Definity PBX product line is now owned by Avaya) and implemented the additional protocols needed to interoperate with their telephone systems. However, it quickly became clear that the number of proprietary protocols was becoming unmanageable. Call models differed between telephone systems, making it difficult to write CTI-enabled application software. The need for a standardized cross-vendor CTI call model and supporting protocol was becoming apparent.

A group of computer and telecommunications equipment vendors interested in this problem approached the European Computer Manufacturers’ Association (now simply known as ECMA) with a proposal to undertake this standardization. The proposal was accepted and Robert Roden, an architect from the Digital Equipment technical team, was chosen as convenor (chairperson) for the standards work. Phase I (the first edition) of CSTA was released in 1992. The CSTA standard has since progressed through several editions, incorporating technologies such as voice response and XML. Each Phase of the CSTA standard includes both a call model as well as a recommended set of communication protocols.

See for more information about the early work on CTI standards.

The initial CTI software from Digital Equipment supported only VAX computers running the VMS operating system both as the server providing the telephone system interconnection and as application clients. Support for Digital's ULTRIX operating system was later added. But during the early 1990s, personal desktop computers became more pervasive in corporate computing environments. Digital Equipment responded to this trend by releasing Pathworks, a networking suite that allowed IBM-compatible PCs and Apple Macintosh computers to participate in a DECnet network. The Digital Equipment CIT team built on this platform and released a PC-based version of the CIT client that supported applications written for the Microsoft Windows operating system. The Windows desktop environment offered easier integration between business applications and telephone functions via the Microsoft Dynamic Data Exchange (DDE) mechanism, since many off-the-shelf PC applications and development platforms supported the DDE interface.

=== Dialogic Acquires Digital's Technology and Team ===
In 1995, Digital Equipment sold the CIT product line to Dialogic Corporation, which was then the leader in server-scale telephone interfaces for the PC form factor. Digital's CIT management staff and most of the development team moved to Dialogic with the sale, forming a new 'CT Division' within Dialogic and maintaining the product’s momentum. Dialogic converted the product from its original proprietary Digital Equipment hardware and software platform to an industry standard platform based on personal computer hardware and the Microsoft Windows family of operating systems. The resulting product, rechristened CT-Connect, was released by Dialogic in August, 1995. (The hyphen was dropped from the name in later releases.)

=== Dialogic Acquired by Intel ===
In 1999, Intel acquired Dialogic and all of its hardware and software product lines including CT Connect. As with the transition from Digital Equipment to Dialogic, most of the CT Connect business and technical team remained after the acquisition and product development and sales continued. CT Connect was renamed Intel NetMerge Call Processing Software to conform to Intel product naming conventions but remained the same product under the skin.

The late 1990s saw the rising popularity of Voice over Internet Protocol (VoIP) telephony. Realizing that CTI would be as important with VoIP as it had with traditional telephony, the CT Connect team enhanced CT Connect to support application control of VoIP voice calls. Intel was issued 11 US patents related to this work.

=== CT Connect Acquired By Envox Worldwide ===
Intel sold the product line to Envox Worldwide in 2005. As before, much of the technical team continued with the product during the transition. Envox restored the product name to CT Connect and continues to market it.

=== Syntellect, Inc. acquires Envox ===
On October 20, 2008, Envox was acquired by Syntellect, Inc. Syntellect is a call center focused software company headquartered in Phoenix, Arizona.
