= List of Java APIs =

There are two types of Java programming language application programming interfaces (APIs):

- The official core Java API, contained in the Android (Google), SE (OpenJDK and Oracle), MicroEJ. These packages (java.* packages) are the core Java language packages, meaning that programmers using the Java language had to use them in order to make any worthwhile use of the Java language.
- Optional APIs that can be downloaded separately. The specification of these APIs are defined according to many different organizations in the world (Alljoyn, OSGi, Eclipse, JCP, E-S-R, etc.).

The following is a partial list of application programming interfaces (APIs) for Java.

== APIs ==
| Name | Acronym | Description and Version History | Available from |
|---|---|---|---|
| Java Advanced Imaging | JAI | A set of interfaces that support a high-level programming model allowing to manipulate images easily. | |
| Association for the standardization of embedded platforms | E-S-R consortium | here | |
| Java Data Objects | JDO | A specification of Java object persistence. | |
| Android API | Google | here | |
| JavaHelp | | A full-featured, extensible help system that enables you to incorporate online help in applets, components, applications, operating systems, and devices. | available here |
| Java Media Framework | JMF | An API that enables audio, video and other time-based media to be added to Java applications and applets. | |
| Java Naming and Directory Interface | JNDI | An API for directory services. | |
| Jakarta Persistence | JPA | A specification for object–relational mapping. | available here |
| Java Speech API | JSAPI | This API allows for speech synthesis and speech recognition. | |
| Java 3D | J3D | A scene graph-based 3D API. | available here |
| Java OpenGL | JOGL | A wrapper library for OpenGL. | available here |
| Java USB for Windows | (none) | A USB communication of Java applications | available here |
| RestFB | (none) | Facebook API wrapper in Java. | available here |
| Twitter4j | (none) | Java library for the Twitter API | available here |
| Discord Java API | JDA | Java library for the Discord API | available here |
| Mixin | SpongePowered | This library adds ability to change existing code | available here |
| Wikipedia4j | llmjava | It's a library that you can use to search and retrieve documents from Wikipedia | available here |
| Oshi | oshi | Library for working with Computer components and their parameters | available here |
| Guava | Google | A set of core Java libraries for collections, caching, primitives support, and more. | available here |
| Apache Commons | Apache | A collection of reusable Java components, including utilities for collections, math, IO, and more. | available here |
| Log4j | Apache | A widely used Java logging library. | available here |
| JUnit | JUnit | A widely used testing framework for Java. | available here |
| Caffeine | (none) | A high-performance caching library for Java. | available here |
| Lombok | (none) | A Java library that reduces boilerplate code with annotations. | available here |
| SLF4J | (none) | A simple logging facade for Java, often used with Logback or Log4j. | available here |
| Retrofit | (none) | A type-safe HTTP client for Java and Android. | available here |
| OkHttp | Square | An HTTP client for Java with features like connection pooling and GZIP compression. | available here |
| Gson | Google | A library for converting Java objects to JSON and back. | available here |
| Jackson | FasterXML | A high-performance JSON processing library. | available here |
| Kryo | EsotericSoftware | A fast and efficient object graph serialization framework. | available here |
| Apache Kafka | Apache | A distributed event streaming platform. | available here |
| Netty | (none) | An asynchronous event-driven network application framework. | available here |
| Vert.x | Eclipse | A reactive toolkit for building distributed applications. | available here |
| Spring Framework | Spring | A powerful framework for building Java applications. | available here |
| Micronaut | (none) | A lightweight framework for building microservices and cloud-native apps. | available here |
| Hibernate | (none) | A powerful ORM (Object–Relational Mapping) framework. | available here |
| Forge | (none) | A popular Minecraft modding API for Java Edition. | available here |
| NeoForge | (none) | A community-driven fork of Forge for Minecraft modding. | available here |
| Fabric | (none) | A lightweight, modular Minecraft modding toolchain. | available here |
| Quilt | (none) | A community-driven fork of Fabric with additional features. | available here |

| Name | Acronym | Java package(s) that contain the API |
|---|---|---|
| Jakarta Activation | JAF | jakarta.activation |
| Jakarta Mail | (none) | jakarta.mail |
| Jakarta Messaging | JMS | jakarta.jms |
| Jakarta Faces | JSF | jakarta.faces |

| Name | Acronym | Available from |
|---|---|---|
| Jakarta XML RPC | JAX-RPC | here and here |
| XQuery API for Java | XQJ | here and here |

| Name | Acronym | Available from |
|---|---|---|
| Connected Limited Device Configuration | CLDC | Reference implementation is available here |
| Java Telephony API | JTAPI | available here |
| STM32 Java technology | STM32Java | available here |
| MicroEJ embedded platform | MicroEJ | available here |

Following is a very incomplete list, as the number of APIs available for the Java platform is overwhelming.

Rich client platforms

- Eclipse Rich Client Platform (RCP)
- NetBeans Platform

Office_compliant libraries

- Apache POI
- JXL - for Microsoft Excel
- JExcel - for Microsoft Excel

Compression

- LZMA SDK, the Java implementation of the SDK used by the popular 7-Zip file archive software (available here)

JSON

- Jackson (API)

Game engines

- Slick
- jMonkey Engine
- JPCT Engine
- LWJGL

Real-time libraries

Real time Java is a catch-all term for a combination of technologies that allows programmers to write programs that meet the demands of real-time systems in the Java programming language.

Java's sophisticated memory management, native support for threading and concurrency, type safety, and relative simplicity have created a demand for its use in many domains. Its capabilities have been enhanced to support real time computational needs:

- Java supports a strict priority based threading model.
- Because Java threads support priorities, Java locking mechanisms support priority inversion avoidance techniques, such as priority inheritance or the priority ceiling protocol.

To overcome typical real time difficulties, the Java Community introduced a specification for real-time Java, JSR001. A number of implementations of the resulting Real-Time Specification for Java (RTSJ) have emerged, including a reference implementation from Timesys, IBM's WebSphere Real Time, Sun Microsystems's Java SE Real-Time Systems,^{[1]} Aonix PERC or JamaicaVM from aicas.

The RTSJ addressed the critical issues by mandating a minimum (only two) specification for the threading model (and allowing other models to be plugged into the VM) and by providing for areas of memory that are not subject to garbage collection, along with threads that are not preempt able by the garbage collector. These areas are instead managed using region-based memory management.

== Real-Time Specification for Java ==
The Real-Time Specification for Java (RTSJ) is a set of interfaces and behavioral refinements that enable real-time computer programming in the Java programming language. RTSJ 1.0 was developed as JSR 1 under the Java Community Process, which approved the new standard in November, 2001. RTSJ 2.0 is being developed under JSR 282. A draft version is available at JSR 282 JCP Page. More information can be found at RTSJ 2.0

- Javolution

Windowing libraries

- Standard Widget Toolkit (SWT)

Physics libraries

- JBox2D
- JBullet
- dyn4j

== See also ==
- Java Platform
- Java ConcurrentMap
- List of Java frameworks
