= VoiceObjects =

American company

VoiceObjects Inc.
- Type: Privately held company
- Industry: Self-service phone portals IVR solutions Applications for mobile phones
- Founded: 2001 in Cologne, Germany
- Founder: Karl-Heinz Land, et al.
- Headquarters: San Mateo, CA
- Key people: Beatriz Infante (CEO), Michael Codini (CTO)
- Products: Software for VoiceXML, USSD, XHTML
- Website: www.VoiceObjects.com

VoiceObjects is a company that produces VoiceXML-based self-service phone portals which personalize each caller's experience and provide mobile access that integrates speech recognition, touch-tone response, texting and mobile web.

== History ==
The company's products are based on a new software architecture for delivering voice portals that leveraged industry standards for the Internet such as VoiceXML, SQL, Eclipse, SNMP, XML, Java, and SOA. In 2007, the company introduced software to support text-based applications for mobile phones using the USSD standard over GSM wireless networks as well as software to support Web-based applications for mobile phones with Web browsers supporting the XHTML 1.0 standard.

== Products ==
- VoiceObjects Desktop - Service Creation Environment
- VoiceObjects Server - Multi-channel Phone Application Server
- VoiceObjects Analyzer - Real-time Analysis and Reporting Environment

In January 2013 Voxeo has renamed the VoiceObjects product name to Voxeo CXP.

A few months later in July 2013 Voxeo has been acquired by Aspect Software and the product offering has been renamed to Aspect CXP Pro.

In May 2021 Aspect Software merged with Noble Systems to form Alvaria.

== Customers ==
VoiceObjects customers included recognizable names such as Adobe, Deutsche Telekom, Hershey's, Kellogg Company, Lufthansa, and Swisscom. The company's partners included SAP, Nortel, Genesys, Avaya, BEA, Oracle, and IBM.

== See also ==
- IVR
- Speech recognition
- VoiceXML
