= VDN (disambiguation) =

VDN may refer to:

- Vin doux naturel, a type of wine
- Vadgaon railway station, on the Mumbai–Chennai line in India
- La Voix du Nord (daily), a French newspaper
- Vector directory number in telephony
