= JXL =

JXL may refer to:

- Java Excel API
- JPEG XL, an image file format
- Junkie XL, Dutch musician
- JXL, vocalist of Crash Worship
