= Carabao (disambiguation) =

Carabao is a domesticated swamp type water buffalo found in the Philippines and Guam.

Carabao may also refer to:

- Carabao (band), a rock band from Thailand
- Carabao (mango), a variety of mango cultivated in the Philippines
- Carabao Energy Drink, a Thai energy drink, the manufacturers of which sponsor:
  - Carabao Cup, the current name of the League Cup in English football
- Carabao Island, Cavite, a small island in Manila Bay in the Philippines
- Carabao Island, Romblon, sole island municipality of San Jose, Romblon, Philippines
- Carabao Linguistic Virtual Machine, a software suite from LinguaSys
- Military Order of the Carabao, a US military social club
