= Dialogic telephony cards =

Dialogic telephony cards was a line of PC expansion cards developed in the 1990s by Dialogic Inc., at the time Media & Signaling Division of Intel Corporation, for computer telephony applications. The cards were produced by Sangoma Technologies Corporation.

The cards were available in ISA, VME, PCI and PCIe bus versions, and were used in PC-based proprietary software solutions for automated telephone systems running on the Wintel platform, including Microsoft Windows NT/2000/XP, NT Server/Server 2000/Server 2003, as well as Solaris and Linux.

The cards were produced in analog phone (2 to 24-port RJ-11) and digital ISDN (T1 up to 96 channels, or E1 up to 120 channels, 1 to 4 port RJ-48C or BNC) line configurations depending on usage.

== Hardware ==
The cards contained up to 18 Motorola 56002, Motorola 56321, or Freescale 56303 DSPs and an Intel 960, Intel 486 or ARMv7 host processor. The cards can handle multiple phone calls simultaneously and route them to the intended point of service. There were several versions that could handle from 24 to 192 voice/conferencing channels on digital ISDN interfaces and from two to 32 analog ports (phone lines).

The Dialogic cards were capable of making and answering calls, identifying caller ID, playing back sounds to the caller and recording sounds from the line, and detecting Dual-Tone Multi-Frequency (DTMF) signals (touch tones) dialed by the caller. They could also tear down a call and detect when the caller has hung up.

Multiple cards can be connected together for increased processing capabilities using proprietary CTBus connector.

Cisco Systems uses these cards in its Unity product line.

== Software ==
Dialogic System Release 6, proprietary software developed by Dialogic Inc., provided predictive dialing, conferencing and interactive voice response (IVR) services which could take calls from clients or customers and route the callers to the appropriate individual or data system. The software was used for automated answering services in AT&T, PG&E, Bank of America and other large corporations. Although often complicated and difficult to navigate, these systems allowed corporations to streamline their telephone service and provide information to customers without the need for human interaction.

== Models ==
2 and 4-port analog, ISA

- Proline/2V
- D/21D
- Dialog/4
- D/41D
- D/41H

16 and 24-port analog, ISA

- D/160SC
- MSI/240SC

Digital T1/E1, ISA

- D/240SC-T1
- D/480SC-2T1

4, 8, 12 and 16-port analog, PCI/PCIe

- D/4PCI
- D/4PCI
- D/41E-PCI
- D/41JCT
- D/42JCT
- D/82JCT
- D/120JCT
- MSI/80PCI
- MSI/160PCI

4-port analog fax, PCI

- VFX/41JCT
- VFX/PCI
- VFX/40ESC

12, 24 and 32-port analog, PCI/PCIe

- DI/SI24
- DI/SI24
- DI/SI32

Digital T1/E1, PCI/PCIe

- D/240JCT-T1
- D/300PCI-E1
- D/480JCT-2T1
- DM/V480A-2T1
- DM/V480-4T1
- D/600JCT-2E1
- DM/V600-4E1
- DM/V960-4T1
- DM/V600BTE
- DM/V1200-4E1
- DM/V1200BTE

Digital T1 and IP/H.323, PCI

- DM/IP481-2T1
