= Telesoft =

Telesoft may be a reference to:

- TeleSoft, an American software products company of the 1980s and 1990s
- TeleSoft Partners, an American venture capital firm founded in the 1990s
- Bharti Telesoft, an Indian telecommunications company of the 2000s that became part of Mahindra Comviva
- Gayatri Telesoft Limited, an Indian television production company for shows such as Yeh Hai Mumbai Meri Jaan
- Telesoftware, a term for "software at a distance" coined in the 1970s
