= Screen pop =

User interface dialog containing call information

Screen pop is a call centre term that refers to the feature of a computer telephony integration (CTI) which automatically displays customer information via a window or dialog box on an agent's computer upon answering a customer's call.

For inbound calls, the data displayed typically contains call information such as:

- Caller ID (CID)
- Automatic number identification (ANI)
- Dialed Number Identification Service (DNIS)
- Information entered from an Interactive voice response (IVR) system.
- Extended information derived from one of the above. For example, the CTI system looking up in a database an order the caller just entered in an IVR, and displaying that order's information to the agent.

For outbound calls, the data displayed typically contains information that was sent to the outbound dialer as part of the customer call record.

== See also ==
- Computer telephony integration
