= Voxeo =

United States communications company

Voxeo Corporation
- Type: Privately Held / Employee-Owned
- Industry: Telecom
- Founded: 1999
- Headquarters: Orlando, Florida, U.S.
- Products: Enterprise-grade server infrastructure Graphical development tools for designing voice self-service portals
- Revenue: unknown
- Number of employees: 150
- Website: www.voxeo.com

Voxeo Corporation was a technology company that provided unified self-service and real-time communications applications for development platforms. Its applications ranged from traditional customer service IVR systems to conferencing systems and outbound notification systems. In 2013, Voxeo was acquired by Aspect Software.

== History ==
Voxeo was founded by Jonathan Taylor in 1999. In 2000 and 2001, the company received around $40 million in investments from Crosspoint Venture Partners, the Mayfield Fund, and others. In September 2004, an employee- and management-led buyout of the investment firms moved the company into being an employee-owned private company. Voxeo was acquired in 2013 by Aspect Software.

In October 2005, Voxeo acquired Vocomo and the VoiceXML IVR platform. In 2006, Voxeo launched a European subsidiary, and acquired VoiceReady, which provided Voxeo with its designer graphical tool.

Voxeo was listed in Gartner's Magic Quadrant for IVR in 2008.

In August 2008, Voxeo acquired SIP Servlet technology and Micromethod Technologies of Beijing China, gaining a presence in Asia. In December 2008, Voxeo announced the acquisition of VoiceObjects of Cologne, Germany. Those acquisitions were followed by hosted IM application provider IMiifed in May 2009, open source telephony framework Adhearsion in July 2009, Motorola's VoiceXML browser business in October 2009, and web collaboration platform Clackpoint in January 2010. Voxeo acquired cloud communications platform Teleku in August 2010 and application provider WebForPhone in November 2010.

Voxeo was listed as one of only two "shortlist" vendors by analyst firm Datamonitor in 2009.

By September 2011, the company reported that over 220,000 developers had joined Voxeo's developer programs. It also received the highest rating of "Strong Positive" in Gartner's 2011 Marketscope for IVR Systems and Enterprise Voice Portals.

In July 2013, the company spun off its Voxeo Labs to form Tropo, Inc. Tropo got acquired by Cisco in 2015.

In 2013, Voxeo was acquired by Aspect Software.

Competitors included Tellme Networks, West Corporation, Genesys, Avaya, and others.

== Products ==
Voxeo's products are all available as SaaS / Platform as a service (public cloud), on-premises software (private cloud), or hybrid clouds that combine the public-cloud and on-premises components.

Voxeo products include:

- Prophecy Interactive Voice Response (IVR) platform
- VoiceObjects multi-channel (IVR, SMS, IM, web, social) service creation environment - rebranded to CXP in 2013
- PRISM SIP/HTTP/XMPP Java application server and media server (previously SIPmethod)
- Tropo multi-lingual cloud-based communications platform for voice, SMS, IM and Twitter
- IMified hosted instant messaging application development and deployment platform
- SMSified hosted SMS (text messaging) application development and deployment platform
- Phono web-based softphone and collaboration SDK

== Services ==
Voxeo provides the Prophecy application platform for premises deployment or via its global hosted infrastructure. The company began initially providing hosted/SaaS services in 2000, and then, offered a premises platform in 2006. In March 2009, Voxeo launched the Tropo.com platform that allows developers to create voice/telephony applications using the languages of Ruby, Python, PHP, Groovy, and JavaScript or via a WebAPI that utilizes a request-response model and talks to an application running on a web server using HTTP and JSON. In May 2011, Voxeo launched SMSified, a new service for developers wanting to build inbound and outbound SMS/text messaging applications.

The Voxeo platform is based on open standards like VoiceXML, CCXML, and SIP, and the company puts a strong emphasis on standards. Former Voxeo employee Dan Burnett chaired the W3C Voice Browser Working Group and was Co-Editor-In-Chief of VoiceXML 3. Former Voxeo CTO RJ Auburn, now with Sighthound, Inc., chaired the W3C CCXML working group.

== See also ==
- List of speech recognition software
- Speech recognition
- IVR
- Telemarketing
- SaaS
