= JTA =

JTA may refer to:

- Jacksonville Transportation Authority, the independent agency responsible for public transit in the city of Jacksonville, Florida, and roadway infrastructure that connects northeast Florida
- Jackson Transportation Authority, the former name of the Jackson Area Transportation Authority, the primary provider of mass transportation in Jackson County, Michigan
- Java Transaction API, one of the Java Enterprise Edition (Java EE) APIs, enables distributed transactions to be done across multiple X/Open XA resources in a Java environment
- Java Telephony API, supports telephony call control
- Japan Transocean Air, an airline based in Naha, Okinawa Prefecture, Japan
- Japan Tourism Agency, an organization which was set up on October 1, 2008 as an extra-ministerial bureau of the Ministry of Land, Infrastructure, Transport and Tourism
- Jewish Telegraphic Agency, a US-based international news agency serving Jewish community newspapers and media around the world
- Taylor–Johnson Temperament Analysis, a personality test designed to measure nine common personality traits for the assessment of individual adjustment
- Junction tree algorithm, a method used in machine learning to extract marginalization in general graphs
- Japan Tennis Association, the governing body for professional and amateur tennis in Japan
- Jianquan Taijiquan Association, a well known school teaching Wu-style tai chi
- Jim Thorpe Association, a civic and charity organization based in Oklahoma City, Oklahoma. It is named in memory of multi-sport legend Jim Thorpe
- Juan Toscano-Anderson, basketball player
