= Automatic call distributor =

Device that directs incoming phone calls

Zip tone
Audible tone which alerts agent of an incoming call. 440 Hz 5 ms.

An automated call distribution system, commonly known as automatic call distributor or automatic call dispatcher (ACD), is a telephony device that answers and distributes incoming calls to a specific group of terminals or agents within an organization. ACDs direct calls based on parameters that may include the caller's telephone number, the number they dialed, the time of day or a response to an automated voice prompt. Advanced ACD systems may use digital technologies such as computer telephony integration (CTI), computer-supported telecommunications applications (CSTA) or IVR as input to determine the route to a person or voice announcement that will serve the caller. Experts claim that "the invention of ACD technology made the concept of a call centre possible."

== Background ==
A Private Branch Exchange (PBX) is a telephone exchange device that acts as a switchboard to route phone calls within an organisation. This technology developed into Automated Call Distribution systems using computer technology to automatically connect incoming calls to recipients based on programmable logic.

Although ACDs appeared in the 1950s, one of the first large and separate ACDs was a modified 5XB switch used by the New York Telephone Company in the early 1970s to distribute calls among hundreds of 4-1-1 information operators. Robert Hirvela developed and received a patent for technology that was used to create the Rockwell Galaxy Automatic Call Distributor, which was used by Continental Airlines for more than 20 years. Since then, ACDs have integrated incoming call management and voice messaging software into its capabilities.

== Application ==
ACD systems route incoming calls to people according to defined rules that may include, for example, the time of day, the day of the week, the geographic location of the caller and the availability of people to respond. The rules should aim to route the call to a person qualified to address the caller's needs. Routing can use caller ID, automatic number identification, interactive voice response or dialed number identification services to determine how calls are handled. ACD systems are often found in offices that handle large volumes of incoming phone calls from callers who require assistance at the earliest opportunity, but have no need to talk to a specific person: e.g., customer service representatives or emergency services dispatch centers.

There are several contact routing strategies that can be set up within an algorithm based on a company's needs. Skills-based routing is determined by an operator's knowledge to handle a caller's inquiry. Virtual contact centers can also be used to aggregate the skill sets of agents to help multiple vendors, where all real-time and statistical information can be shared amongst the contact center sites. An additional function for these external routing applications is to enable Computer telephony integration (CTI), which improves efficiency for call center agents by matching incoming phone calls with relevant data via screen pop.

== Distribution methods ==
Methods for distributing incoming calls from a queue include

- Linear Call Distribution – Calls are distributed in order, starting at the beginning each time
- Circular/Rotary Call Distribution – Calls are distributed in order, starting with the next in order
- Uniform Call Distribution – Calls are distributed uniformly, starting with the person who has handled the fewest calls
- Simultaneous Call Distribution – Calls are presented to all available extensions simultaneously
- Weighted Call Distribution – Calls are distributed according to a configurable weighting, such as differing skill sets within customer service representatives.

== See also ==
- Number Five Crossbar Switching System
- Communications system
- Vector directory number
- Zip tone
