= Computer-supported telecommunications applications =

Computer-supported telecommunications applications (CSTA) is an abstraction layer for telecommunications applications. It is independent of underlying protocols. It has a telephone device model that enables CTI applications to work with a wide range of telephone devices.

Originally developed in 1992, it has continued to be developed and refined over the years. It is often the model that most CTI applications are built on and claim compliance with. It became an OSI standard in July 2000. It is currently being maintained by ECMA International.

The core of CSTA is a normalized Call Control model. Additional to the core there are Call Associated features and Physical Device features amongst others. An implementation of the standard need not provide all features, and so Profiles are provided. For example, the Basic Telephony profile provides such features as Make Call, Answer and Clear Connection.

== History ==
CSTA has seen 3 major revisions to date.

- Phase 1 1992
- Phase 2 1994
- Phase 3 1998

== Recent developments ==
Phase 3 of the CSTA standard saw the introduction of uaCSTA, CSTA XML and CSTA Object Model extensions. These extensions are in various states of completion but all extend the scope of CSTA.

== Example of Underlying Protocols ==
Protocols that may be used by CSTA.

- SIP
- H.323
- ACSE/ROSE

== See also ==
- CTI
- Java Telephony API
- Telephony Application Programming Interface (TAPI)
