= Telephony Server Application Programming Interface =

Computer telephony integration standard developed and promoted by Novell and AT&T

Telephony Server Application Programming Interface was a computer telephony integration standard developed and promoted by Novell and AT&T. It consisted of a number of call control commands for switching calls, voice mail and call logging using NetWare servers. Unlike the competing Telephony Application Programming Interface from Microsoft and Intel, it was a server-based system that did not expect client-side equipment to handle call switching. This was important to AT&T, which sold large telephone switches that Telephony Server Application Programming Interface was intended to work with.

== Description ==
Telephony Server Application Programming Interface consisted of two primary parts, the application programming interface itself, and a "telephony service provider" that ran on a server and talked to clients. Novell produced one such provider, "TServer" that ran, unsurprisingly, on NetWare servers. TServer, in turn, talked to a driver specific to the brand of telephony switch being used. NetWare acted primarily as the operating system for TServer to run within, although TServer did make use of NetWare Directory Services for security and provisioning. The whole system from client-side drivers to server to private branch exchange driver was known as "NetWare Telephony Services", at least when using Novell software.

Message formats were based on a standard promoted by the European Computer Manufacturers Association, which was directly supported by a number of European-built switches. When used with one of these switches, the driver between the server and the switch was "thin". "Thicker" drivers were needed for switches that did not directly support these standards. The client-side application programming interface was available for Windows 3.1, Windows 95, Windows NT, OS/2, Mac OS, UnixWare and Linux.

The interface was a control protocol only, and did not send a voice data across the network for use with software-based phones. It included commands for dialing, hanging up, and other instructions. It required a channel, called a stream, to be set up for all communications.

== Telephony Server Application Programming Interface and Versit ==
Telephony Server Application Programming Interface was created in an era when major telephony vendors were promoting a vision of wide-area networking based on dedicated circuit-switched links. Unlike modern networking systems where each piece of data is separately routed to its destination, these networking systems were essentially a version of the existing phone system carrying data instead of voice, setting up dedicated channels between endpoints. Looking for applications that might make use of such a network, vendors promoted numerous new standards for videotelephony, high-speed fax, etc.

Only the control system was standardized; getting data into and out of a computer remained an issue. There were a number of efforts by various vendors to support this functionality. Apple Computer was promoting GeoPort as the computer-end of such a system, and selected Telephony Server Application Programming Interface as the messaging protocol. The various vendors formed the Versit Consortium and published "The Versit CTI Encyclopedia." The Encyclopedia expanded the basic system to include a data-type identifier to allow it to switch any sort of "call". Additionally, Versit allowed that data to be switched to the computer using GeoPort or a number of other connection options.
