= TeleSoft Partners =

American venture capital firm

Coordinates: 37.4237°N 122.2103°W

- Type: Private company
- Industry: Venture Capital
- Founded: 1996
- Founder: Arjun Gupta
- Headquarters: San Francisco, California, United States
- Website: www.telesoftvc.com

TeleSoft Partners is a venture capital firm located in Aspen, Colorado.

== The firm ==
TeleSoft Partners provides capital to high-tech and energy value chain companies specializing on the internet, Wireless, software, systems, applications, and services industries. TeleSoft typically invests $1-$15 million per company and is stage agnostic, including investments across companies in the early, development & expansion, and late stages of their development life cycle. The firm has raised capital commitments of $625 million and focuses on approximately 25-30 investments per fund.

TeleSoft was founded in 1996 by Arjun Gupta, a member of the investment group that purchased the Sacramento Kings in 2013.

== Investments ==
Investments include: Salesforce.com, Skype Qik, LiteScape Technologies, Calix Inc., Validity Sensors, Ikanos Communications, VoiceObjects, Nexant, Lara Networks, Zantaz, Cerent Corporation, Tele Atlas, and Loglogic.
