= Alvaria =

Software company

Alvaria Inc.
- Formerly: Aspect Communications (1973-2005); Aspect Software, Inc. (2005-2021)
- Type: Private
- Industry: Call center technology Customer experience Software
- Founded: 1973; 53 years ago
- Headquarters: Boston, Massachusetts, United States
- Area served: Worldwide
- Key people: [Jeff Cotten] (CEO)
- Products: Alvaria Cloud; Alvaria CX Suite; Alvaria Workforce Engagement Management Suite; Alvaria Motivate; Alvaria Workforce
- Revenue: $443 million (FY 2014)
- Owner: Abry Partners; Vector Capital
- Number of employees: 1,915 (2022)
- Website: www.alvaria.com

Alvaria, Inc., formerly Aspect Software, Inc., is an American multinational software company that sells call center and customer experience (CX) software technology to large enterprises. The company is headquartered in Westford, Massachusetts. In 2021, Aspect purchased Noble Systems Corporation; the resultant organization was officially announced in September 2021 as Alvaria, Inc.

Alvaria has offices in Africa, Asia, Oceania, Europe, North America, and South America.

== History ==
Aspect was founded under the name Aspect Communications in 1973, when its software powered the first call center flight booking system with an intelligent Automatic Call Distributor.

In 2005, Aspect Communications was acquired by Concerto Software for $1 billion, with the new entity called Aspect Software. Concerto was created in 2002 when Davox Corporation acquired CELLIT and renamed itself Concerto Software, Inc.

In 2006, Aspect borrowed $1.16 billion to finance its international expansion.

In 2006, Aspect opened its first office offshore in Bangalore, India.

In 2011, Aspect opened a facility in Ireland.

In 2012, Aspect had its credit rating lowered by Standard & Poor's because of the large amount of debt. In 2015, Moody's lowered its credit rating as well. In March 2016, Aspect filed for bankruptcy to reduce its debt load, and emerged from Chapter 11 in May 2016.

In 2012, most of the management was replaced with a new team led by Stewart Bloom. Over the next year, Aspect relocated its headquarters to Phoenix, Arizona.

In 2016, Aspect released Via Customer Engagement Center, including various products from Aspect's portfolio.

In February 2019, Aspect was acquired by Vector Capital.

== Acquisitions and investments ==
In 2008, Aspect formed an alliance with Microsoft with the latter making an investment in Aspect. Later in 2008, Aspect acquired Massachusetts-based BlueNote Networks.

In 2009, Aspect acquired UK-based AIM Technology.

In 2010, Aspect acquired St. Louis-based Quilogy.

In 2013, Aspect invested into Bright Pattern and acquired Voxeo for $150 million.

In 2015, Aspect acquired LinguaSys to add natural language messaging capabilities. LinguaSys technology became the basis of Aspect's Natural Language Understanding component for the Aspect CXP platform. The technology was used to create a chatbot for the supermarket chain Lidl, that won the 2018 Best Consumer Chatbot award at the CogX AI conference, beating X.ai and Microsoft's Xiaoice.

In 2021, Aspect merged with Noble Systems Corporation to form Alvaria.

In 2022, Alvaria acquired Cicero Inc.

== Products ==
- Alvaria Cloud, formerly Aspect Via, cloud call centre software.
- Alvaria CX Suite, combines Aspect Unified IP, Aspect ALM, Noble CC and Noble OnQ
- Alvaria Workforce (WFM)
- Alvaria Employee Experience (EX)
- Alvaria Real Time Optimizer
- Alvaria Mobile

== Awards and recognition ==
Aspect Software was recognized by industry analyst firms such as Frost & Sullivan.
