= Telephony service provider =

A telephony service provider, as defined in Microsoft's TAPI specification, is a software interface to a physical telephony device (such as a modem) that can be accessed programmatically to perform actions such as dialing a phone number or logging a call. TSPs can be thought of as a TAPI specific driver for a telephony device.

== Example ==
Example Windows 10 supplies:

- hidphone.tsp
- remotesp.tsp
- unimdm.tsp (universal modem)
- kmddsp.tsp (kernel mode device driver)
