= PhoneValet Message Center =

- Developer: Parliant Corporation
- Stable release: 4.0 / March 17, 2006
- Operating system: Mac OS X
- Type: CTI
- License: Commercial
- Website: parliant.com/phonevalet/

PhoneValet Message Center (or, simply, PhoneValet) is a discontinued Mac-based multi-line computer-telephony software application from Parliant Corporation. The application provided computer-telephony functionality including voicemail, call recording, and the maintenance of a call history. The system is a combination of software and hardware. PhoneValet was awarded an Eddy award (Macworld Magazine's editors choice award) for 2006.

== History ==
PhoneValet was initially released on July 23, 2003 as a system to maintain a list of inbound and outbound calls, including telephone numbers, start and end times and notes. The system also enabled pop-up announcements of incoming callers based on Caller ID, and a spoken announcement of this and ancillary information drawn from a user-maintained address book. Additional functionality included dialing with automatic determination of long distance and calling card codes. This initial version did not allow the telephone to be answered as the hardware device provided could not take the line off-hook.

On June 30, 2004, Parliant released version 2.0 of PhoneValet, now with the Message Center moniker. This version shipped with a revised hardware device (the same one shipping today) designed to allow the computer to answer the telephone. The 2.0 product integrated voice mail messages into the 1.0 product's call history system. The new device also supported automatic gain control, providing the ability to make high-quality audio recordings of both sides of telephone calls. The manufacturer made several further releases within the 2.0 rubric, adding the ability to dial in to check for messages, information center features and real-time voicemail audio screening.

On July 11, 2005, Message Center 3.0 was released. Along with this update, Parliant released two large PhoneValet extensions: PhoneValet Anywhere and PhoneValet PodCast. PhoneValet Anywhere allowed users to manage the core functions of the PhoneValet Message Center over the internet through a new web interface. PhoneValet PodCast was more of a tool-suite designed to help PodCast makers record and edit phone conversations, including a background sound scrubbing tool and a stereo audio editor with a DSP. The core Message Center 3.0 update added ring-tones, call blocking, and individualized greetings tied to specific callers.

The 4.0 version March 17, 2006 was a free upgrade adding automatic recording of all calls on the line (prior to this time call recording was activated manually by the user).

On November 20, 2006 Parliant released version 5.0 with automated attendant features and unlimited-depth call trees. Automated attendant functions allowed a caller to specify the person, department or extension they wish to be transferred to. The application accomplished this on a single line by paging the person or department through the computer's speakers, playing hold music to the caller in the meantime. If the call went unanswered the caller was directed to a voice mailbox or to make further selections.

The product was discontinued in May 2011, with continued technical support until June 2012.
