= WindowPhone =

Computer telephony product for Windows

- Screenshot of the pop-up window, showing contact information and a photograph
- Original author: Mark Emery
- Developer: AG Communication Systems
- Release: January 27, 1992; 34 years ago
- Final release: 1.2 / July 1992; 34 years ago
- Operating system: Windows 3.x
- Available in: English
- Type: Computer telephony integration
- License: Proprietary

WindowPhone is a discontinued computer telephony integration hardware and software product introduced in 1992. It allows users of Microsoft Windows to view the caller ID of incoming calls on their landline telephone service. Developed by AG Communication Systems, a joint venture between AT&T and GTE, it received high praise from journalists and sold decently well for AG.

== Overview ==
WindowPhone allows users of Microsoft Windows to view the caller ID of incoming calls on their telephone line. As shipped, it comprised a half-height 8-bit ISA expansion card, software on floppy disks, an AC adapter, and an RJ-11 telephone cord. The user first connects a telephone cord from the wall to one of two jacks on the expansion card; then the user connects the expansion card to the user's receiver via the cord provided with the WindowPhone. When a call is placed to the user's telephone line, the included software retrieves the caller ID information from the line and displays it atop the current Windows session via a pop-up window. If the incoming call lacks caller ID, only the phone number is displayed. By tapping a key after the call is picked up, this window expands to include more fields for the user to populate with e.g. the caller's name, relationship, and miscellaneous notes, saving this information to a database file that the software then consults and displays when the same incoming caller makes another call to the user. Besides textual information, the expanded window also provides a field for an image file representing the caller, as well as a map of their location.

In addition to this feature, WindowPhone also stores a detailed log of all phone calls, detailing whether they were incoming and outgoing, the names of the calling parties, and the duration of each call. WindowPhone also allows users to block certain phone numbers from placing calls on their line—both on an individual basis or per prefix (such as 900 numbers). As an alternative to blocking, WindowPhone can shunt these calls to an auto-attendant password menu screen, prompting for a specific password or else the call is disconnected. Users can also designate certain phone numbers as priorities, giving them special ringtones. Using the included AC adapter, the WindowPhone expansion card can log calls even when the user's PC is powered off. It saves all the same logging information to the card's internal RAM, which is capable of storing up to 100 entries before running out of space; once Windows is reloaded, it dumps this information to the log file on the PC's hard drive.

Users can also use WindowPhone as an autodialer to place phone calls to other people. Users can input these phone numbers manually, or they can look up the name of a person with a contact stored on the computer and dial the associated phone number. A speed dial screen with up to 20 entries allows users to quickly place calls with a single click. Certain entries in the database can be password protected to prevent unauthorized access. WindowPhone also allows the users to set reminders to place calls at certain times.

Starting in version 1.2 of the software (released in mid-1992), AG added support for Dynamic Data Exchange, allowing users to import or export the database of saved callers and logged calls to and from other applications such as Microsoft Excel.

== Development and release ==
WindowPhone was developed by a team of 15 researchers helmed by Mark Emery at AG Communication Systems, a joint venture between AT&T and GTE based in Phoenix, Arizona. WindowPhone was first publicly unveiled in October 1991 and was released on January 27, 1992. (Note: AG initially slated WindowPhone for a December 1991 release, but it missed this deadline.) WindowPhone was the first consumer product of AG, which primarily manufactured central office switching equipment for the various RBOCs in the United States. WindowPhone was initially developed for Windows 3.0; version 1.2 was optimized for Windows 3.1, introduced by Microsoft in April 1992. AG originally targeted single-phone-line households for the initial WindowPhone version before expanding their target market to large businesses for version 1.2. AG continued selling WindowPhone into mid-1995.

=== Microsoft trademark disputes ===
In the mid-1990s, Microsoft attempted to sue AG Communication Systems over WindowPhone, alleging trademark infringement between it and its Windows operating system. In 1999, however, the Court of Appeal of Paris ruled that AG had the right to continue using the WindowPhone trademark in France, as it had been filed earlier in April 1992 (versus June 1992 for Microsoft Windows). Microsoft later dropped their lawsuit.

In March 2012, Microsoft sent a petition to the United States Patent and Trademark Office to have AG's trademark on WindowPhone terminated in order for Microsoft to market their Windows Phone smartphone operating system without the threat of legal obstruction. In September 2012, Microsoft and AG reached an out-of-court settlement in which Microsoft acquired the rights to AG's WindowPhone trademark.

== Reception ==
Patrick Marshall of InfoWorld called the software "undeniably slick" and wrote that after AG dropped the price of WindowPhone from US$495 to $295 (equivalent to $623 in 2025), it went from "a tempting luxury" to "a hard-to-pass-up item". Hugh Anderson of The Gazette praised the versatility of the WindowPhone software and called its price point "reasonable for business customers with lots of customer calls to handle", but he concluded that for personal use it was "not a good deal". Byte was less enthusiastic, with Rich Friedman summarizing that "WindowPhone is a package that you either love or hate; you use it all the time, or you feel it's a gross waste of valuable disk space".
