= Vector directory number =

Phone call routing technique

A vector directory number (VDN) is an extension on an automatic call distributor that directs an incoming call to a "vector" — a user-defined sequence of functions that may be performed, such as routing the call to a destination, giving a busy signal, or playing a recorded message. This number is a "soft" extension number not assigned to an equipment location.

VDNs must be set up according to the customer's dial plan and the optional vectoring software must be enabled. VDN is used in different call center environments.

== See also ==
- Virtual number
