= LinguaSys =

American multilingual human language software company

LinguaSys, Inc.
- Industry: software
- Founded: 2010
- Founder: Brian Garr
- Headquarters: Boca Raton, Florida
- Products: TGPhoto
- Services: multilingual human language software
- Website: linguasys.net

LinguaSys, Inc. was a company headquartered in Boca Raton, Florida. LinguaSys provided multilingual human language software and services to financial, banking, hospitality, Customer Relations Management, technology, forensics and telecommunications blue chip enterprises, and the government and military.

== History ==
LinguaSys was co-founded by chief executive officer Brian Garr in Boca Raton, Florida, USA; Chief Technology Officer Vadim Berman in Melbourne, Australia; and Vice President of Development and Architecture Can Unal in Darmstadt, Germany in 2010.

CEO Brian Garr was formerly CTO of Globalink from 1995 to 1998 and is a recipient of the Smithsonian Institution's "Heroes in Technology" award for his work in Machine Translation.

Billionaire Mark Cuban began investing in LinguaSys, Inc., in 2012.

Also in 2012, LinguaSys partnered with Salesforce.com, adding multilingual text analytics abilities to the company's social marketing services.

In 2014, LinguaSys made their technology available in a public cloud.

In 2015, LinguaSys added NLUI Server, which enables building Siri-like natural language applications rapidly in a variety of languages, to the products available in the public cloud.

In August 2015, LinguaSys was acquired by Aspect Software.

== Products and services ==
LinguaSys uses interlingual natural language processing software to provide multilingual text, sentiment, relevance and conceptual understanding and analysis. LinguaSys trademarked its proprietary interlingual technology called Carabao Linguistic Virtual Machine. LinguaSys' multilingual software solutions are customized by clients and used via SaaS and behind the firewall. LinguaSys is an IBM Business Partner.

LinguaSys' multilingual technology is used on enterprise servers and consumer smartphones.

LinguaSys has developed an app TGPhoto which allows the user to snap a photo of some text and show a translation to one of fifty languages. The software works on Android, and Blackberry smartphones.
