= MicroEJ =

French-American software company

- Type: Private
- Industry: Virtualization, computer programming
- Founded: 2004
- Founder: Fred Rivard
- Headquarters: Nantes, France
- Area served: Worldwide
- Number of employees: 60 (in 2021)
- Website: microej.com

MicroEJ (pronounced "micro-EDGE") is a French-American independent software vendor with headquarters in Nantes, France and offices in Boston, Massachusetts, USA. It was founded by Fred Rivard in 2004. It is known for developing MICROEJ VEE, a Virtual Execution Environment for embedded software development and other software development tools such as the software development kit MICROEJ SDK.

== History ==
Fred Rivard founded MicroEJ under the name Industrial Smart Software Technologies (IS2T). MicroEJ established its offices in Boston in 2016.

At the 2020 Consumer Electronics Show (CES), MicroEJ announced plans to release an app store platform for IoT devices.

MicroEJ partnered with Groupe SEB to integrate MICROEJ VEE into its food processor products in 2021. In the same year, MicroEJ also partnered with NXP Semiconductors to offer a MICROEJ VEE platform on NXP's i.MX RT500 MCU for wearables.

At CES 2022, MicroEJ launched the first containerized software platform for smart home and industrial devices connected using the Matter protocol. In 2022, MicroEJ also partnered with Thales to offer MICROEJ VEE on the Thales Cinterion IoT Module and Plug and Play IoT Devices. MicroEJ also partnered with Telit to develop Telit IoT cellular modules' software development ecosystem.

In 2023, MicroEJ announced collaboration with Polar Electro to integrate MICROEJ VEE several wearable products. The company also revealed collaboration with Schneider Electric to integrate MICROEJ VEE technology in Industrial IoT products^{.}

In 2024, MicroEJ and NXP Semiconductors introduced the NXP Platform Accelerator, a joint solution combining MICROEJ VEE software containers with NXP hardware. The platform was designed to facilitate modular software development for embedded and industrial applications.

Also in 2024, MicroEJ launched VEE Wear, an operating system for wearable devices. VEE Wear was developed to support low-power operation, modular software deployment, and compatibility with Android development tools. The platform includes support for the Facer Engine to enable customizable watch faces.

In 2025, MicroEJ introduced VEE Energy, a software platform aimed at enhancing smart grid and utility applications. The platform supports edge intelligence by enabling artificial intelligence and remote software updates on existing metering infrastructure.

In 2026, MicroEJ introduced VEE Audio, a software platform for connected audio devices deployed on Qualcomm's Snapdragon Sound platforms. MicroEJ also collaborated with Qualcomm on Snapdragon Sound Apps and Agents, a framework for third-party applications and artificial intelligence services on compatible audio devices.

== Products ==
MICROEJ VEE (Virtual Execution Environment) comes in the form of a runtime environment and its associated software libraries for running containers (also called virtual machines) reproducing the behavior of embedded systems. MicroEJ uses Instruction Set hardware virtualization to deliver software in packages called containers and enable the creation of app stores.

MicroEJ also provides a simulator allowing the development of software applications on virtual devices (actual embedded devices simulated on workstations).

MicroEJ provides an IDE based on Eclipse for creating embedded software and applications on desktop. MICROEJ SDK supports programming languages such as C, Java, JavaScript, and Kotlin. Applications can also be developed using Android Studio and Gradle.
