= Skills-based routing =

Skills-based routing (SBR), or skills-based call routing, is a call-assignment strategy used in call centres to assign incoming calls to the most suitable agent, instead of simply choosing the next available agent. It is an enhancement to the automatic call distributor (ACD) systems found in most call centres. The need for skills-based routing has arisen as call centres have become larger and dealt with a wider variety of call types.

In the past, agents answering calls were generally able to be assigned to only one queue taking one type of call. This meant that agents who could deal with a range of call types had to be manually reassigned to different queue at different times of the day to make the best use of their skills, or face being exposed to a wide variety of calls for which they were not trained. With skills-based routing, the skills needed for a particular call are often assessed by the dialled telephone number and the calling number or caller's identity, as well as choices made in any associated IVR system. Given this assessment, a skills-based routing system then attempts to match the call to a suitably trained agent—the thinking being that an agent with matching skills will be able to provide a better service than one who does not.

As a consequence, the separate large queues that were characteristic of the ACD-driven call centre have disappeared. Instead, each caller seems to have their own waiting area that they may share with only one or two others. Instead of being served in the order of their arrival, calls are served as agents with appropriate skills become available.

Manufacturers claim that this technology improves customer service, shortens call-handling time, makes training shorter and easier, and thus increases agent utilisation, productivity, and, hence, revenue. Skills-based routing has thus become a major selling point, over the simpler ACD that it replaces.

However, independent analysts and consultants argue that the extra complexity of a skills-based routing system might not return the claimed benefits. They outline the difficulty of predetermining the needed skills and suggest that a poorly implemented skills-based routing system might result in poor service, because the wrong measures of service quality are being used.

Theoretical work on skills-based routing system tends to be more limited, with researchers trying to identify suitable queueing theory and operations research models to represent the problems that are raised by skills-based routing systems. Some consider it a fruitful area of research. Others claim that the traditional queueing theory formula, such as Erlang-C, are no longer relevant for determining staff schedules, because they are inaccurate. They also imply that theoretical approaches will not be accurate, because of the complexity involved—arguing that simulation needs to be used instead. Although these claims need to be considered carefully, as it is argued also that the inaccuracies result from failing to understand the assumptions of the Erlang-C approach, instead of actual inaccuracy with the theory.
