= Dialed Number Identification Service =

Dialed Number Identification Service (DNIS) is a service offered by telecommunications companies to corporate clients which identifies the originally dialed telephone number of an inbound call. The client may use this information for call routing to internal destinations or activation of special call handling.

For DNIS service, the telephone company sends a sequence of typically four to ten digits during call setup.

Direct inward dial (DID) service also provides DNIS.

For example, a company may have a different toll-free telephone number for each product line it sells, or for multilingual customer support. If a call center is handling calls for multiple product lines, the corporate telephone system that receives the call analyzes the DNIS signaling and may play an appropriate recorded greeting. For interactive voice response (IVR) systems, DNIS is used as routing information for dispatching purposes, to determine which script or service should be activated based on the number that was dialed to reach the IVR platform.

In the United States, DNIS is commonly provided for 800- and 900-services.

== See also ==
- Automatic number identification
