= Computer telephony integration =

Technology that allows interactions on a telephone and a computer to be coordinated

Computer-telephony integration, also called computer–telephone integration or CTI, is a general term for technologies that coordinate interactions between telephones and computers. The term is predominantly used to describe desktop-based applications that improve user efficiency, though it can also refer to server-based functionality such as automatic call routing.

== See also ==
- Automatic number identification (ANI)
- Automatic call distributor
- Dialed Number Identification Service (DNIS)
- Predictive dialer
- Screen pop
- Computer-supported telecommunications applications (CSTA)
- Multi-Vendor Integration Protocol
- Specific implementations:
  - CT Connect
  - PhoneValet Message Center
  - Telephony Application Programming Interface (TAPI)
  - Telephony Server Application Programming Interface (TSAPI)
  - WindowPhone
