= Java Excel API =

- Developers: Andy Khan, Eric H. Jung
- Stable release: 2.6.12 / 8 October 2012
- Written in: Java
- Operating system: Cross-platform
- Type: API to access Microsoft Excel format
- License: GNU LGPL v2.1+
- Website: jexcelapi.sourceforge.net

Java Excel API (a.k.a. JXL API) allows users to read, write, create, and modify sheets in an Excel (.xls) workbook at runtime. It does not support .xlsx format.

== Microsoft Excel support ==
Java Excel API supports Excel documents with versions Excel 95, 97, 2000, XP, and 2003. These documents hold the extension .xls.

== Usage ==
Java Excel API is widely used with Selenium.

=== Example ===
Sample code to write to an Excel file might look like as follows:

import java.io.File;
import jxl.Workbook;
import jxl.write.WritableSheet;
import jxl.write.WritableWorkbook;
import jxl.write.Label;
import jxl.write.WriteException;

public class DataSheet
{
    private Workbook wbook;
    private WritableWorkbook wwbCopy;
    private WritableSheet shSheet;

    public void readExcel()
    {
        try
        {
            wbook = Workbook.getWorkbook(new File("path/testSampleData.xls"));
            wwbCopy = Workbook.createWorkbook(new File("path/testSampleDataCopy.xls"), wbook);
            shSheet = wwbCopy.getSheet(0);
        }
        catch (Exception e)
        {
            e.printStackTrace();
        }
    }
   
    public void setValueIntoCell(String strSheetName, int iColumnNumber, int iRowNumber, String strData) throws WriteException
    {
        WritableSheet wshTemp = wwbCopy.getSheet(strSheetName);
        Label labTemp = new Label(iColumnNumber, iRowNumber, strData);
               
        try 
        {
            wshTemp.addCell(labTemp);
        }
        catch (Exception e)
        {
            e.printStackTrace();
        }
    }
   
    public void closeFile()
    {
        try 
        {
            // Closing the writable work book
            wwbCopy.write();
            wwbCopy.close();

            // Closing the original work book
            wbook.close();
        }
        catch (Exception e)
        {
            e.printStackTrace();
        }
    }
   
    public static void main(String[] args) throws WriteException
    {
        DataSheet ds = new DataSheet();
        ds.readExcel();
        ds.setValueIntoCell("sheet1", 5, 1, "PASS");
        ds.setValueIntoCell("sheet1", 5, 2, "FAIL");
        ds.setValueIntoCell("sheet1", 5, 3, "PASS");
        ds.closeFile();
    }
}

== See also ==
- Apache POI
- Open Packaging Conventions
- Office Open XML software
