= Interactive voice response =

Voice or tone user interface for telephony

Interactive voice response (IVR) systems are automated telephony systems that interact with callers, gather information, and route calls to the appropriate recipient. They operate using voice recognition and Dual-Tone Multi-Frequency (DTMF) input from a telephone keypad. IVR systems are widely used to manage customer interactions efficiently, improve service accessibility, and streamline business operations.

IVR systems can be used to create self-service solutions for mobile purchases, banking payments, services, retail orders, utilities, travel information and weather conditions. In combination with systems such an automated attendant and automatic call distributor (ACD), call routing can be optimized for a better caller experience and workforce efficiency. IVR systems are often combined with automated attendant functionality. The term voice response unit (VRU) is sometimes used as well.

== History ==
Despite the increase in IVR technology during the 1970s, the technology was considered complex and expensive for automating tasks in call centers. Early voice response systems were digital signal processing (DSP) technology based and limited to small vocabularies. In the early 1980s, Leon Ferber's Perception Technology became the first mainstream market competitor, after hard drive technology (read/write random-access to digitized voice data) had reached a cost-effective price point. At that time, a system could store digitized speech on disk, play the appropriate spoken message, and process the human's DTMF response.

As call centers began to migrate to multimedia in the late 1990s, companies started to invest in computer telephony integration (CTI) with IVR systems. IVR became vital for call centers deploying universal queuing and routing solutions and acted as an agent which collected customer data to enable intelligent routing decisions. With improvements in technology, systems could use speaker-independent voice recognition of a limited vocabulary instead of requiring the person to use DTMF signaling.

Starting in the 2000s, voice response became more common and cheaper to deploy. This was due to increased CPU power and the migration of speech applications from proprietary code to the VoiceXML (VXML) standard.

== Technology ==
DTMF decoding and speech recognition are used to interpret the caller's response to voice prompts. DTMF tones are entered via the telephone keypad.

Other technologies include using text-to-speech (TTS) to speak complex and dynamic information, such as e-mails, news reports or weather information. IVR technology is also being introduced into automobile systems for hands-free operation. TTS is computer generated synthesized speech that is no longer the robotic voice traditionally associated with computers. Real voices create the speech in fragments that are spliced together (concatenated) and smoothed before being played to the caller.

An IVR can be deployed in several ways:

- Equipment installed on the customer premises
- Equipment installed in the PSTN (public switched telephone network)
- Application service provider (ASP) / hosted IVR

An automatic call distributor (ACD) is often the second point of contact when calling many larger businesses. An ACD uses digital storage devices to play greetings or announcements, but typically routes a caller without prompting for input. An IVR can play announcements and request an input from the caller. This information can be used to profile the caller and used by an ACD to route the call to an agent with a particular skill set.

Interactive voice response can be used to front-end a call center operation by identifying the needs of the caller. Information can be obtained from the caller such as an account number. Answers to simple questions such as account balances or pre-recorded information can be provided without operator intervention. Account numbers from the IVR are often compared to caller ID data for security reasons and additional IVR responses are required if the caller ID does not match the account record.

IVR call flows are created in a variety of ways. A traditional IVR depended upon proprietary programming or scripting languages, whereas modern IVR applications are generated in a similar way to Web pages, using standards such as VoiceXML, CCXML, SRGS and SSML. The ability to use XML-driven applications allows a web server to act as the application server, freeing the IVR developer to focus on the call flow.

IVR speech recognition interactions (call flows) are designed using three approaches to prompt for and recognize user input: directed, open-ended, and mixed dialogue.

A directed dialogue prompt communicates a set of valid responses to the user (e.g. "How can I help you? ... Say something like, account balance, order status, or more options"). An open-ended prompt does not communicate a set of valid responses (e.g. "How can I help you?"). In both cases, the goal is to glean a valid spoken response from the user. The key difference is that with directed dialogue, the user is more likely to speak an option exactly as was communicated by the prompt (e.g. "account balance"). With an open-ended prompt, however, the user is likely to include extraneous words or phrases (e.g. "I was just looking at my bill and saw that my balance was wrong."). The open-ended prompt requires a greater degree of natural language processing to extract the relevant information from the phrase (i.e. "balance"). Open-ended recognition also requires a larger grammar set, which accounts for a wider array of permutations of a given response (e.g. "balance was wrong", "wrong balance", "balance is high", "high balance"). Despite the greater amount of data and processing required for open-ended prompts, they are more interactively efficient, as the prompts themselves are typically much shorter.

A mixed dialogue approach involves shifting from open-ended to directed dialogue or vice versa within the same interaction, as one type of prompt may be more effective in a given situation. Mixed dialog prompts must also be able to recognize responses that are not relevant to the immediate prompt, for instance in the case of a user deciding to shift to a function different from the current one.

Higher level IVR development tools are available to further simplify the application development process. A call flow diagram can be drawn with a GUI tool and the presentation layer (typically VoiceXML) can be automatically generated. In addition, these tools normally provide extension mechanisms for software integration, such as an HTTP interface to a website and a Java interface for connecting to a database.

In telecommunications, an audio response unit (ARU) (often included in IVR systems) is a device that provides synthesized voice responses to DTMF keypresses by processing calls based on (a) the call-originator input, (b) information received from a database, and (c) information in the incoming call, such as the time of day. ARUs increase the number of information calls handled and provide consistent quality in information retrieval.

== Usage ==
IVR systems are used to service high call volumes at lower cost. The use of IVR allows callers' queries to be resolved without a live agent. If callers do not find the information they need, the calls may be transferred to a live agent. The approach allows live agents to have more time to deal with complex interactions. When an IVR system answers multiple phone numbers, the use of DNIS ensures that the correct application and language is executed. A single large IVR system can handle calls for thousands of applications, each with its own phone numbers and script.

Call centers use IVR systems to identify and segment callers. The ability to identify customers allows services to be tailored according to the customer profile. The caller can be given the option to wait in the queue, choose an automated service, or request a callback. The system may obtain caller line identification (CLI) data from the network to help identify or authenticate the caller. Additional caller authentication data could include account number, personal information, password and biometrics (such as voice print). IVR also enables customer prioritization. In a system wherein individual customers may have a different status, the service will automatically prioritize the individual's call and move customers to the front of a specific queue.

IVRs will also log call detail information into its own database for auditing, performance report, and future IVR system enhancements. CTI allows a contact center or organization to gather information about the caller as a means of directing the inquiry to the appropriate agent. CTI can transfer relevant information about the individual customer and the IVR dialog from the IVR to the agent desktop using a screen pop, making for a more effective and efficient service. Voice-activated dialing (VAD) IVR systems are used to automate routine inquiries to a switchboard or PABX (Private Automatic Branch exchange) operators, and are used in many hospitals and large businesses to reduce the caller waiting time. An additional function is the ability to allow external callers to page staff and transfer the inbound call to the paged person. IVR can be used to provide a more sophisticated voice mail experience to the caller.

=== Banking ===
Banking institutions are reliant on IVR systems for customer engagement and to extend business hours to a 24/7 operation. Telephone banking allows customers to check balances and transaction histories as well as to make payments and transfers. As online channels have emerged, banking customer satisfaction has decreased.

=== Medical ===
IVR systems are used by pharmaceutical companies and contract research organizations to conduct clinical trials and manage the large volumes of data generated. The caller will respond to questions in their preferred language and their responses will be logged into a database and possibly recorded at the same time to confirm authenticity. Applications include patient randomization and drug supply management. They are also used in recording patient diaries and questionnaires.

IVR systems allow callers to obtain data relatively anonymously. Hospitals and clinics have used IVR systems to allow callers to receive anonymous access to test results. This is information that could easily be handled by a person but the IVR system is used to preserve privacy and avoid potential embarrassment of sensitive information or test results. Users are given a passcode to access their results.

=== Surveying ===
Some of the largest installed IVR platforms are used for televoting on television game shows, such as Pop Idol and Big Brother, which can generate enormous call spikes. The network provider will often deploy call gapping in the PSTN to prevent network overload. IVR may also be used by survey organizations to ask more sensitive questions where the investigators are concerned that a respondent might feel less comfortable providing these answers to a human interlocutor (such as questions about drug use or sexual behavior). In some cases, an IVR system can be used in the same survey in conjunction with a human interviewer.

== Social impact ==
By allowing low-literacy populations to interact with technology, IVR systems form an avenue to build technological skills in developing countries. Developing countries have a prevalence of mobile phones even in rural areas, which allows room for IVR technology to support social good projects. However, most IVR technology is designed in resource-rich domains hence research is necessary to contextualize and adapt this technology for developing countries. Research in ICTD has helped tailor IVR towards social impact has created innovative applications in health, agricultural, entertainment and citizen journalism.

=== Healthcare ===
In the context of tuberculosis (TB), patients need to take medicine on a daily basis for a period of few months to completely heal. In public sector, there is a scheme called directly observed treatment, short-course (DOTS) which was the most effective source for poor population.

The 99DOTS project uses IVR technology to benefit TB patients. Patients have a customized packet of tablets that they receive from the healthcare official who trains them to take the medicine in the sequence daily. Opening the packet in a sequence reveals a phone number that the patient needs to dial to acknowledge that they have taken the medicine. This research project was based out of Microsoft Research India by Bill Theis and who received the MacArthur Fellowship for the project. The project has spun off as Everwell Technologies, which now works closely with the Government of India to scale this technology to patients throughout India.

=== Community-based entertainment ===
Although radio is a very popular means of entertainment, IVR provides interactivity, which can help listeners engage in novel ways using their phones. ICTD research has used IVR entertainment as a mechanism to support communities and provide information to populations that are hard to reach by traditional methods.

- Sangeet Swara: voice-based singing platform for low literate users in India. Although this platform was for a broader audience, it saw large participation from visually impaired people.
- Gurgaon Idol: was a singing competition used voice system, where users could vote and sing to a number presented on radio.
- Polly: A voiced based viral entertainment system that allowed users to modify their voice and share it with their contacts. The authors used the virality to play relevant job advertisements for literate population. Polly's model for entertainment has been adapted to spread information about maternal health for fathers, agriculture and community generated content.

=== Civic engagement ===
IVR has been used for community generated content which NGOs and social organizations can tailor to spread relevant content to hard to reach population.

- Graam Vanni: meaning 'voice of the village', is a social technology company incubated out of IIT Delhi which uses IVR as the main medium. Mobile Vaani is a product of this company which connects to hard to reach in northern India with development messages, employment alerts, entrepreneurial activities, and also conduct market research studies. Mobile Vaani network caters to 500,000 households in northern India. Graam Vaani has impacted 2.5 million house holds since it started.
- CGnet swara: A community-generated journalism platform that provided rural populations of people in the forests of Central Tribal India to broadcast their grievances. The system was moderated by editors who listened to these messages and later transcribed these messages onto a blog.

== Developments ==
=== Video ===
The introduction of Session Initiation Protocol (SIP) means that point-to-point communications are no longer restricted to voice calls but can now be extended to multimedia technologies such as video. IVR manufacturers have extended their systems into IVVR (interactive voice and video response), especially for the mobile phone networks. The use of video gives IVR systems the ability to implement multimodal interaction with the caller.

The introduction of full-duplex video IVR in the future will allow systems the ability to read emotions and facial expressions. It may also be used to identify the caller, using technology such as Iris scan or other biometric means. Recordings of the caller may be stored to monitor certain transactions and can be used to reduce identity fraud.

=== SIP contact center ===
With the introduction of SIP contact centers, call control in a SIP contact center can be implemented by CCXML scripting, which is an adjunct to the VoiceXML language used to generate modern IVR dialogues. As calls are queued in the SIP contact center, the IVR system can provide treatment or automation, wait for a fixed period, or play music. Inbound calls to a SIP contact center must be queued or terminated against a SIP end point; SIP IVR systems can be used to replace agents directly by the use of applications deployed using BBUA (back-to-back user agents).

=== Interactive messaging response (IMR) ===
IVR technology is being used to automate instant messaging (IM) conversations using existing natural language processing software. This differs from email handling as email automated response is based on key word spotting and IM conversations are conversational. The use of text messaging abbreviations and emojis requires different grammars to those currently used for speech recognition. IM is also starting to replace text messaging on multimedia mobile handsets.

=== Hosted vs. on-premises IVR ===
With the introduction of web services into the contact center, host integration has been simplified, allowing IVR applications to be hosted remotely from the contact center. This has meant hosted IVR applications using speech are now available to smaller contact centers across the globe and has led to an expansion of ASP (application service providers).

IVR applications can also be hosted on the public network, without contact center integration. Services include public announcement messages and message services for small business. It is also possible to deploy two-prong IVR services where the initial IVR application is used to route the call to the appropriate contact center. This can be used to balance loading across multiple contact centers or provide business continuity in the event of a system outage.

== Criticism ==
Surveys show IVR is generally unpopular with customers. It is difficult to use and unresponsive to the caller. A 2025 analysis of 10,000 patient phone calls found that automated menus and long hold times were among the most common reasons callers hung up before reaching a person. Many customers object to talking to an automated system. There is a perception that IVR is adopted because it allows companies to save money and allow the hiring of fewer employees to answer the phone. Additionally, as basic information is now available online, the calls coming into a call center are more likely to be complex problems and not ones that can be resolved in an automated fashion, thus requiring the attention of a live agent.

== See also ==
- Automatic number identification – Feature of a telecommunications network
- Call avoidance – Voice or tone user interface for telephony
- Call whisper – Process of evaluating telephone calls
- Dialog system – Computer system to converse with a human
- Dialed Number Identification Service (DNIS)
- Dual-tone multi-frequency (DTMF)
- Electronic patient-reported outcome
- Radix economy
- Speech recognition
- Voice portal – Web portals where information is accessed via voice commands
- Voder – Electronic voice synthesizer
- Voice-based marketing automation – Software platforms
- Voice user interface – Interface for spoken human interaction with computers
