= Automatic number identification =

Feature of a telecommunications network

Automatic number identification (ANI) is a feature of a telecommunications network for automatically determining the origination telephone number on toll calls for billing purposes. Automatic number identification was originally created by the American Telephone and Telegraph Company (AT&T) for long distance service in the Bell System, eliminating the need for telephone operators to manually record calls.

Modern ANI has two components: information digits, which identify the class of service, and the calling party billing telephone number.

The term is also used to describe the functions of two-way radio selective calling that identify the transmitting user.

ANI is distinct from newer caller ID services, such as call display, which are solely for informing a subscriber.

== Toll-free telephone numbers ==
Modern toll-free telephone numbers, which generate itemized billing of all calls received instead of relying on the special fixed-rate trunks of the Bell System's original Inward WATS service, depend on ANI to track inbound calls to numbers in special area codes such as +1-800, 888, 877, 866, 855, 844, and 833 with 822 reserved for future toll free use (United States and Canada), 1800 (Australia) or 0800 and 0808 (United Kingdom).

== Privacy ==
ANI is conceptually and technically different from caller ID service. A caller's telephone number and line type are captured by ANI service even if caller ID blocking is activated. The destination telephone company switching office can relay the originating telephone number to ANI delivery services subscribers. Toll-free subscribers and large companies normally have access to ANI, either instantly via installed equipment, or from a monthly billing statement. Residential subscribers can obtain access to ANI information through third party companies that charge for the service.

== Automatic number announcement ==
ANI is used to provide automatic number announcement, a test facility of a central office for telephone installation technicians. The service, which is not advertised to the public, allows an installer to identify a line by dialing a telephone number. Such numbers are typically assigned in a a range reserved for testing purposes (such as 958-xxxx in much of North America).

== DNIS ==
Dialed Number Identification Service (DNIS) is a related service feature available to private branch exchange subscribers. It transmits information about the destination number, which a service provider can use to have several toll-free numbers directed to the same call center and provide unique service. DNIS can also be used to identify other call routing information. For example, toll-free service can be configured to send a specific DNIS number that is assigned to callers from geographic regions based on city, area code, state, or country.

== Similar services ==
- Europe: Calling Line Identification (CLI)
- United Kingdom: Caller Line Identification (CLID)
- Australia: Automatic number identification (ANI) 1800801920 or 12722123 (Telstra line only, local call cost)
