= Java Telephony API =

The Java Telephony API (JTAPI) was an application programming interface designed to provide telephony call control within the Java programming language. It was designed to provide an interface between a Java-based application and the telephony system, from first-party call control in a consumer device to third-party call control in large distributed call centers. The final release of JTAPI was version 1.4, released in July 2002.
