= Call centre =

Office dealing with a large volume of enquiries by telephone

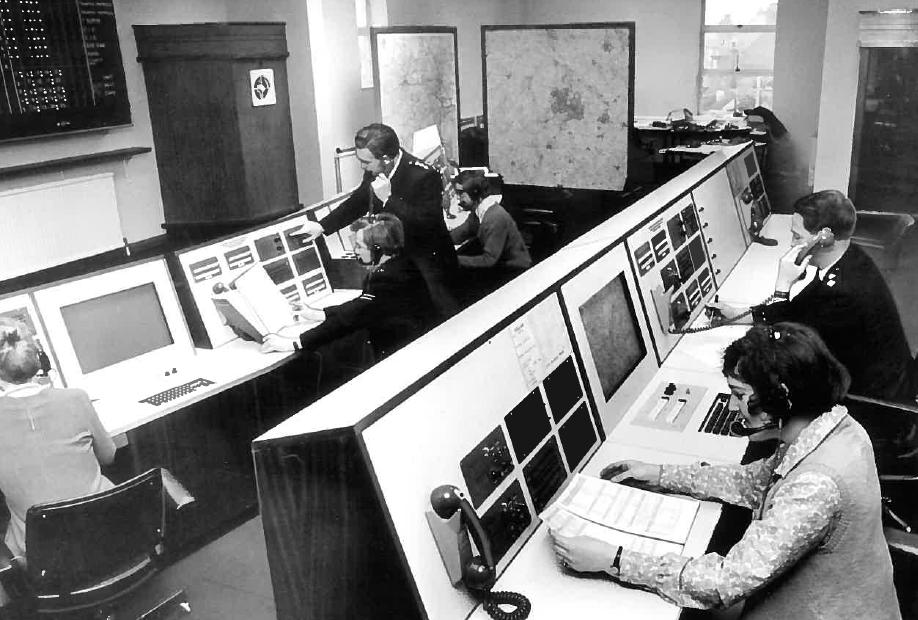
A 1970 police call centre in Brierley Hill, England

A call centre (Commonwealth spelling) or call center (American spelling; see spelling differences) is a managed capability that can be centralised or remote that is used for receiving or transmitting a large volume of enquiries by telephone. An inbound call centre is operated by a company to administer incoming product or service support or information inquiries from consumers. Outbound call centres are usually operated for sales purposes such as telemarketing, for solicitation of charitable or political donations, debt collection, market research, emergency notifications, and urgent/critical needs blood banks. A contact center is a further extension of call centres telephony based capabilities, supporting additional communication channels that may include letters, faxes, live support software, social media, instant message, and email.

A call centre was previously seen as an open workspace for call centre agents, with workstations that included a computer and display for each agent and were connected to an inbound/outbound call management system, and one or more supervisor stations. It can be independently operated or networked with additional centres, often linked to a corporate computer network, including mainframes, microcomputer, servers and LANs. Generative AI and workflow automation are increasingly deployed in contact centres to resolve routine inquiries without human intervention and to assist human agents as real-time conversational copilots. While these tools accelerate resolution rates and lower operating expenses, they also restructure contact centre staffing–reducing demand for entry-level transactional agents through attrition while shifting human representatives toward high-complexity troubleshooting and emotional de-escalation.

The contact centre is a central point from which all customer contacts are managed. Through contact centres, valuable information can be routed to the appropriate people or systems, contacts can be tracked, and data may be gathered. It is generally a part of the company's customer relationship management infrastructure. The majority of large companies use contact centres as a means of managing their customer interactions. These centres can be operated by either an in-house department responsible or outsourcing customer interaction to a third-party agency (known as Outsourcing Call Centres).

== History ==
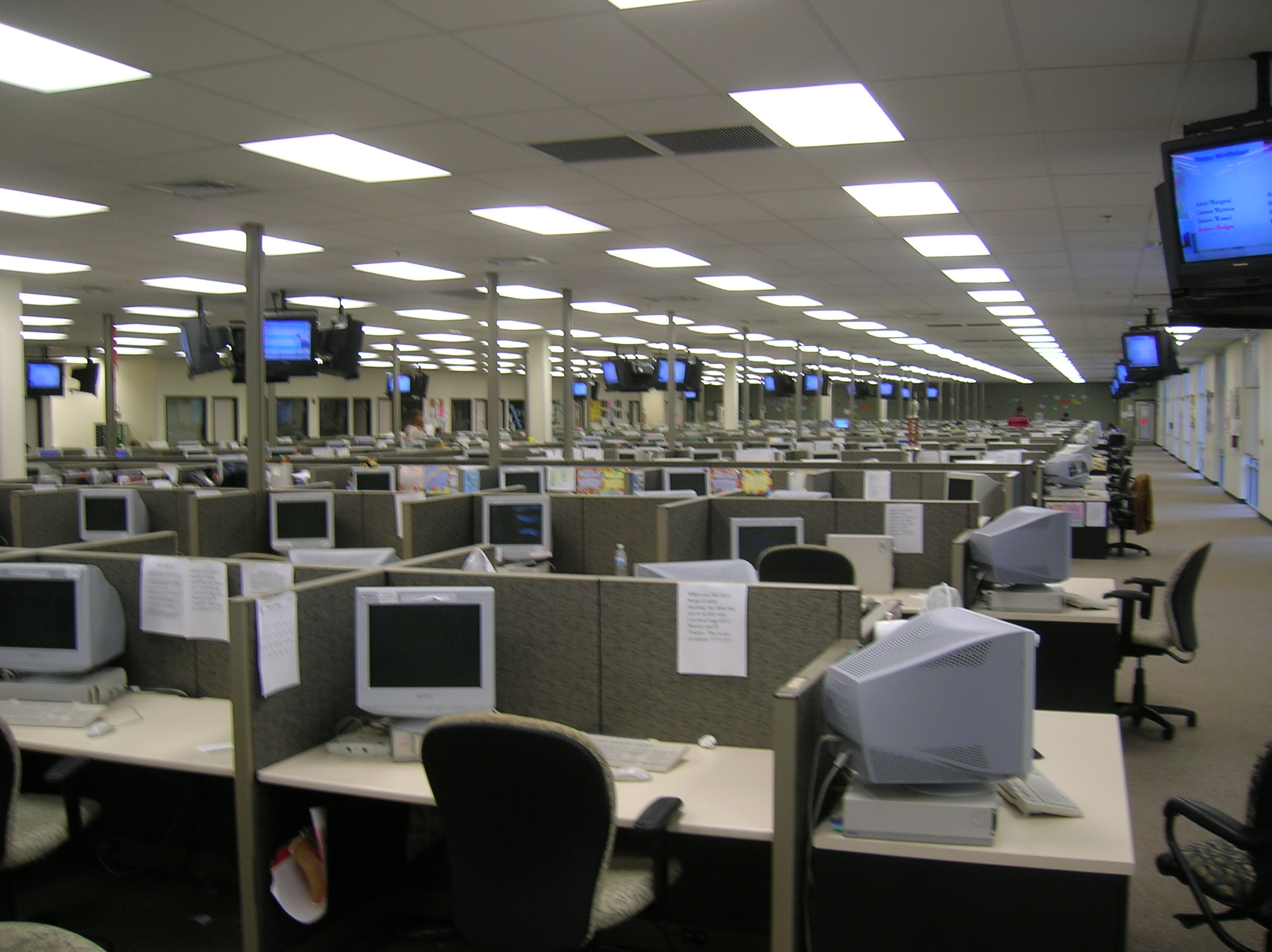
A very large call centre in Lakeland, Florida (2006)

Answering services, as known in the 1960s through the 1980s, earlier and slightly later, involved a business that specifically provided the service. Primarily, by using an off-premises extension (OPX) for each subscribing business, connected at a switchboard at the answering service business, the answering service would answer the otherwise unattended phones of the subscribing businesses with a live operator. The live operator could take messages or relay information, doing so with greater human interactivity than a mechanical answering machine. Although undoubtedly more costly (the human service, the cost of setting up and paying the phone company for the OPX on a monthly basis), it had the advantage of being more ready to respond to the unique needs of after-hours callers. The answering service operators also had the option of calling the client and alerting them to particularly important calls.

The origins of call centres date back to the 1960s with the UK-based Birmingham Press and Mail, which installed Private Automated Business Exchanges (PABX) to have rows of agents handling customer contacts. By 1973, call centres had received mainstream attention after Rockwell International patented its Galaxy Automatic Call Distributor (GACD) for a telephone booking system as well as the popularisation of telephone headsets as seen on televised NASA Mission Control Center events.

During the late 1970s, call centre technology expanded to include telephone sales, airline reservations, and banking systems. The term "call centre" was first published and recognised by the Oxford English Dictionary in 1983. The 1980s saw the development of toll-free telephone numbers to increase the efficiency of agents and overall call volume. Call centres increased with the deregulation of long-distance calling and growth in information-dependent industries.

As call centres expanded, workers in North America began to join unions such as the Communications Workers of America and the United Steelworkers. In Australia, the National Union of Workers represents unionised workers; their activities form part of the Australian labour movement. In Europe, UNI Global Union of Switzerland is involved in assisting unionisation in the call center industry, and in Germany Vereinte Dienstleistungsgewerkschaft represents call centre workers.

During the 1990s, call centres expanded internationally and developed into two additional subsets of communication: contact centres and outsourced bureau centres. A contact centre is a coordinated system of people, processes, technologies, and strategies that provides access to information, resources, and expertise, through appropriate channels of communication, enabling interactions that create value for the customer and organisation. In contrast to in-house management, outsourced bureau contact centres are a model of contact centre that provide services on a "pay per use" model. The overheads of the contact centre are shared by many clients, thereby supporting a very cost effective model, especially for low volumes of calls. The modern contact centre includes automated call blending of inbound and outbound calls as well as predictive dialling capabilities, dramatically increasing agents' productivity. New implementations of more complex systems require highly skilled operational and management staff that can use multichannel online and offline tools to improve customer interactions.

== Technology ==
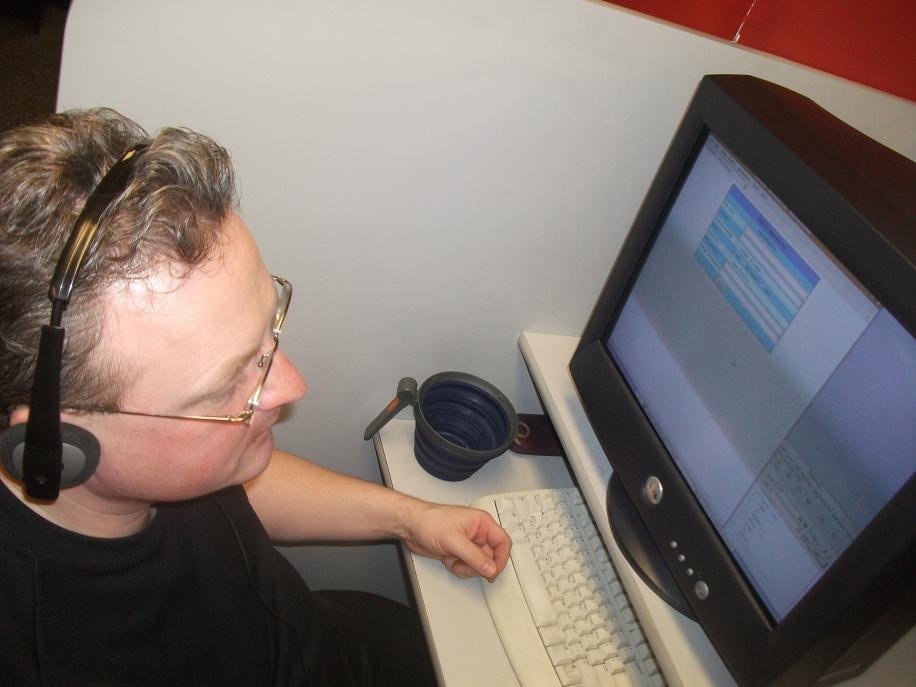
Call centre worker confined to a small workstation/booth, using CallWeb Internet-based survey software

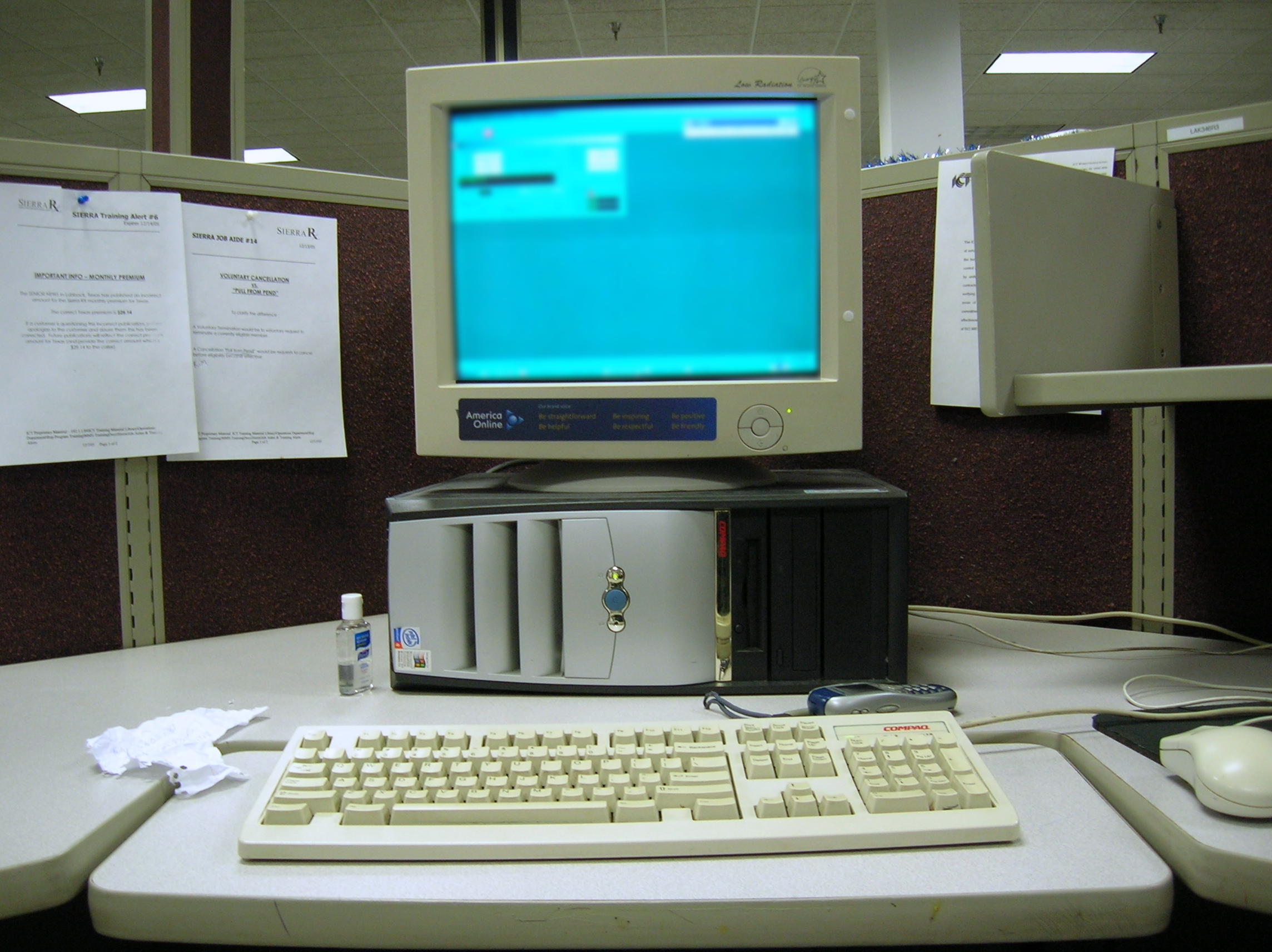
Workstation

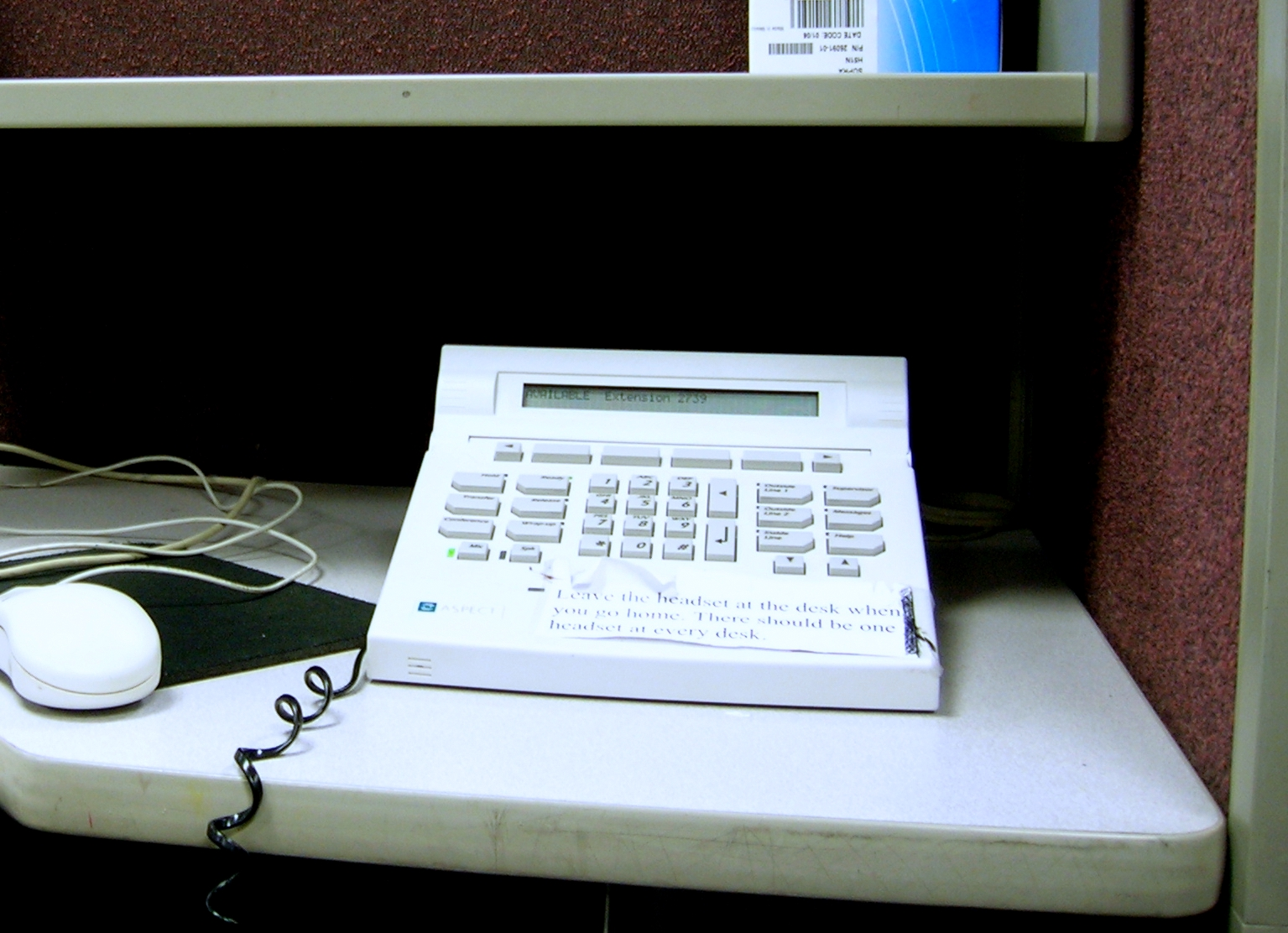
A typical call centre telephone; note absence of handset — phone is for headset use only

Call-centre technology c. 2005

Call centre technologies often include: speech recognition software which allowed Interactive Voice Response (IVR) systems to handle first levels of customer support, text mining, natural language processing to allow better customer handling, agent training via interactive scripting and automatic mining using best practices from past interactions, support automation and many other technologies to improve agent productivity and customer satisfaction. Automatic lead selection or lead steering is also intended to improve efficiencies, both for inbound and outbound campaigns. This allows inbound calls to be directly routed to the appropriate agent for the task, whilst minimising wait times and long lists of irrelevant options for people calling in.

For outbound calls, lead selection allows management to designate what type of leads go to which agent based on factors including skill, socioeconomic factors, past performance, and percentage likelihood of closing a sale per lead.

The universal queue standardises the processing of communications across multiple technologies such as fax, phone, and email. The virtual queue provides callers with an alternative to waiting on hold when no agents are available to handle inbound call demand.

=== Premises-based technology ===
Historically call centres have been built on Private branch exchange (PBX) equipment owned, hosted, and maintained by the call centre operator. The PBX can provide functions such as automatic call distribution, interactive voice response, and skills-based routing.

=== Virtual call centre ===
In a virtual call centre model, the call centre operator (business) pays a monthly or annual fee to a vendor that hosts the call centre telephony and data equipment in their own facility, cloud-based. In this model, the operator does not own, operate or host the equipment on which the call centre runs. Agents connect to the vendor's equipment through traditional PSTN telephone lines, or over voice over IP. Calls to and from prospects or contacts originate from or terminate at the vendor's data centre, rather than at the call centre operator's premises. The vendor's telephony equipment (at times data servers) then connects the calls to the call centre operator's agents.

Virtual call centre technology allows customer service representatives to operate remotely, connecting to the organisation's telephony and CRM systems via cloud infrastructure instead of working from a central office. This approach promotes greater accessibility for individuals with disabilities and supports distributed or hybrid workforce models across different regions. The only required equipment is Internet access, a workstation, and a softphone. If the virtual call centre software utilises webRTC, a softphone is not required to dial. The companies are preferring Virtual Call Centre services due to cost advantage. Companies can start their call centre business immediately without installing the basic infrastructure like Dialer, ACD and IVRS.

Virtual call centres became increasingly used after the COVID-19 pandemic restricted businesses from operating with large groups of people working in close proximity.

=== Cloud computing ===
Through the use of application programming interfaces (APIs), hosted and on-demand call centres that are built on cloud-based software as a service (SaaS) platforms can integrate their functionality with cloud-based applications for customer relationship management (CRM), lead management and more.

Developers use APIs to enhance cloud-based call centre platform functionality—including Computer telephony integration (CTI) APIs which provide basic telephony controls and sophisticated call handling from a separate application, and configuration APIs which enable graphical user interface (GUI) controls of administrative functions.

=== Outsourcing ===
Outsourced call centres are often located in developing countries, where wages are significantly lower than in western countries with higher minimum wages. These include the call centre industries in the Philippines, Bangladesh, and India.

Companies that regularly utilise outsourced contact centre services include British Sky Broadcasting and Orange in the telecommunications industry, Adidas in the sports and leisure sector, Audi in car manufacturing and charities such as the RSPCA.

== Industries ==
=== Healthcare ===
The healthcare industry uses outbound call centre programmes to help manage billing, collections, and patient communication. The inbound call centre is a service meant for various types of healthcare facilities, including large hospitals.

These healthcare call centres are designed to help streamline communications, enhance patient retention and satisfaction, reduce expenses and improve operational efficiencies.

=== Hospitality ===
Many large hospitality companies such as the Hilton Hotels Corporation and Marriott International make use of call centres to manage reservations. These are known in the industry as "central reservations offices". Staff members at these call centres take calls from clients wishing to make reservations or other inquiries via a public number, usually a 1-800 number. These centres may operate as many as 24 hours per day, seven days a week, depending on the call volume the chain receives.

== Evaluation ==
=== Mathematical theory ===
Queueing theory is a branch of mathematics in which models of service systems have been developed. A call centre can be seen as a queueing network and results from queueing theory such as the probability an arriving customer needs to wait before starting service useful for provisioning capacity. (Erlang's C formula is such a result for an M/M/c queue and approximations exist for an M/G/k queue.) Statistical analysis of call centre data has suggested arrivals are governed by an inhomogeneous Poisson process and jobs have a log-normal service time distribution. Simulation algorithms are increasingly being used to model call arrival, queueing and service levels.

Call centre operations have been supported by mathematical models beyond queueing, with operations research, which considers a wide range of optimisation problems seeking to reduce waiting times while keeping server utilisation and therefore efficiency high.

== Criticism ==
Call centres have received criticism for low rates of pay and restrictive working practices for employees, which have been deemed as a dehumanising environment. Other research illustrates how call centre workers develop ways to counter or resist this environment by integrating local cultural sensibilities or embracing a vision of a new life. Most call centres provide electronic reports that outline performance metrics, quarterly highlights and other information about the calls made and received. This has the benefit of helping the company to plan the workload and time of its employees. However, it has also been argued that such close monitoring breaches the human right to privacy.

Complaints are often logged by callers who find the staff do not have enough skill or authority to resolve problems, as well as appearing apathetic. These concerns are due to a business process that exhibits levels of variability because the experience a customer gets and results a company achieves on a given call are dependent upon the quality of the agent. Call centres are beginning to address this by using agent-assisted automation to standardise the process all agents use. However, more popular alternatives are using personality and skill based approaches. The various challenges encountered by call operators are discussed by several authors.

== Media portrayals ==
Call centres located in India have been the focus of several documentary films: the 2004 film Thomas L. Friedman Reporting: The Other Side of Outsourcing, the 2005 films John and Jane, Nalini by Day, Nancy by Night, 1-800-India: Importing a White-Collar Economy, and the 2006 film Bombay Calling, among others. An Indian call centre is also the subject of the 2006 film Outsourced and a key location in the 2008 film, Slumdog Millionaire. The 2014 BBC fly on the wall documentary series The Call Centre gave an often distorted although humorous view of life in a Welsh call centre.

== See also ==
- Automatic call distributor
- Business process outsourcing
- Call management
- List of call centre companies
- Predictive dialling
- Operator messaging
- Queue management system
- Skills based routing
- The Call Centre, a BBC fly-on-the-wall documentary at a Welsh call centre
- Virtual queue
