= Tailscale =

Software company

Tailscale Inc.
- Type: Private
- Industry: Computer networking; Software-defined networking
- Founded: 2019
- Founders: Avery Pennarun; David Crawshaw; David Carney; Brad Fitzpatrick
- Headquarters: Toronto, Ontario, Canada
- Key people: Avery Pennarun; David Carney; Brad Fitzpatrick
- Website: tailscale.com

Tailscale
- Developer: Tailscale Inc.
- Stable release: 1.104.7 / November 12, 2026; 1 day ago
- Operating system: Windows 10, 11; Windows Server 2016+; macOS 13+; Android 8+; iOS 15+ (Note: Including iPadOS); tvOS 17+; visionOS 1+; Debian, Linux, Plan9
- Type: SD-WAN; P2P; VPN; ZTNA
- License: BSD
- Website: tailscale.com
- Repository: github.com/tailscale/tailscale

Tailscale Inc. is a software company based in Toronto, Ontario. Tailscale develops an open-source software-defined mesh virtual private network (VPN) and a web-based management service. (Note: Although Tailscale provides VPN software and services, it should not be misconstrued to be what is commonly referred to as a VPN service, but note that Tailscale's software can be integrated with the Mullvad VPN service.) The company provides a zero config VPN as a service under the same name.

The company's name was inspired by a 2013 Google research paper, The Tail at Scale.

== History ==
In 2019, Google engineers Avery Pennarun, David Crawshaw, David Carney, and Brad Fitzpatrick founded Tailscale.

In November 2020, Tailscale secured funding of US$12 million in a Series A round, led by Accel, with seed investors Heavybit and Uncork Capital participating.

In May 2022, the company secured a US$100 million Series B round, led by CRV and Insight Partners, with participation from existing investors.

In April 2025, the company secured a US$160 million Series C round, led by Accel, with participation from CRV, Insight Partners, Heavybit, and Uncork Capital.

== Software ==
The open-source software acts in combination with the management service to establish peer-to-peer or relayed VPN communication with other clients using the WireGuard protocol.

Tailscale can open direct connection to the peer using NAT traversal techniques such as STUN or request port forwarding via UPnP IGD, NAT-PMP or PCP. If the software fails to establish direct communication, it falls back to using DERP (Designated Encrypted Relay for Packets) protocol relays provided by the company.

The IPv4 addresses given to clients are in the RFC 6598 carrier-grade NAT reserved space. This was chosen to reduce interference with existing networks.

The Linux client can also send traffic to networks behind itself by disabling SNAT and routing directly to the source IPs.

=== Supported platforms ===
The Tailscale client software supports a number of operating systems and embedded software systems:

- Windows
- macOS
- iOS and tvOS
- Linux
- Android
- Synology
- QNAP

The software also provides support for a Kubernetes operator and Docker images.

== Features ==
=== Taildrop ===
Taildrop is an encrypted peer-to-peer file sharing service that has entered a public alpha. It is available to all users on all plans, once enabled from the admin console. Its user facing functionality is similar to AirDrop on iOS or Quick Share on Android.

=== Exit Nodes ===
Exit Nodes, in a setup similar to Tor, is a node where Tailscale connects to the rest of the internet. These can be configured on most devices with Tailscale installed, and when this is done they act as the decryption point for your traffic. Tailscale also started a public beta (a paid add-on), partnering with Mullvad to allow users exit via Mullvad servers.
