= Jasomi Networks =

Jasomi Networks, Inc.
- Type: Private company
- Industry: Computer software session border controller research and development computer hardware
- Founded: Santa Clara, California (August 16, 2001)
- Founder: Dan Freedman; David A. Bryan; Cullen Jennings
- Fate: acquired
- Headquarters: Calgary, Alberta, Canada
- Key people: Dan Freedman (Chairman and Founding CEO); David A. Bryan (Founding CTO); Todd Simpson (CEO); Alan Hawrylyshen (CTO as of 2002)
- Products: PeerPoint peerpoint enterprise edition peerpoint centrex edition
- Number of employees: 23 (2005)
- Website: www.jasomi.com

Jasomi Networks was a pioneer in the development of Session Border Controllers (SBCs), computer network devices that enable, control, and monitor the flow of multimedia data streams across carrier networks, corporate networks, home networks, and the Internet.

== History and evolution ==
The concept for Jasomi was conceived in a meeting between Cullen Jennings and David A. Bryan, who introduced the concept to Dan Freedman, resulting in the founding of the corporation in 2001. Funded by the founders and early employee Benjamin Freedman, the company quickly created a demonstrable SBC, and began to market it as the PeerPoint product line at the Fall 2001 VON trade show organized by Jeff Pulver.

Strong early interest encouraged Freedman and Jennings to commit additional bootstrapping funds from themselves and friends and family. An R&D center was established in Calgary, Alberta, Canada in early 2002, and Alan Hawrylyshen joined the team. 2002 was spent turning the early demonstrator into a more full featured and supportable product. Ryan Kereliuk and Johnson Wu joined the company in mid-2002, and in late 2002, Jasomi adopted a hybrid coopetition model of software development, keeping certain advancements proprietary while releasing others to the public through the reSIProcate open-source SIP stack. David A. Bryan left the company and Alan Hawrylyshen became CTO in late 2002.

Between 2002 and 2004, the company advanced the state of the art in SBC technology, providing customers for the first time with the ability to perform VoIP through existing NAT-enabled firewalls so that residential subscribers could be supported without placing any hardware on their premises. An early customer making great use of this facility was Jeff Pulver's Free World Dialup, which provided free calling services worldwide amongst its subscribers using the SIP VoIP protocol.

In 2005, the company was acquired by Ditech Communications (itself later acquired by Nuance Communications) in a deal valued at $20 million.

== Investment ==
Jasomi was unusual (although not unique) in that it shunned venture capital, relying initially on self-funding by the founders, and later on money invested by friends and family. A total of about $2.8M was raised, much of that in the few months preceding the company's acquisition. The company's main competitors were Acme Packet and Kagoor Networks that had each raised about $40M, and Netrake that had raised about $70M. By comparison, virtually all of Jasomi's operating funds came in organically from customers in the form of revenue – a true bootstrapping startup experience.

== Performance ==
Substantially as a result of being capital-poor, the company could not hire a large number of employees, and the company eventually settled into the number 3 spot in the industry behind Acme Packet and Kagoor Networks, as repeatedly reported by market research firm Infonetics. Nevertheless, by 2005, the company was firmly established as a leading technical player in the field and was generally recognized as having consistently advanced the state of the art in SBC technology during that period.

== Partnership with Microsoft ==
A mutual customer of Jasomi and Microsoft asked the two companies to work together to make Jasomi's PeerPoint product line work with Microsoft's Live Communications Server. Although the relationship suffered from typical big company / small company issues, Jasomi was successful in modifying its product to support Microsoft's non-standards-based extensions to the SIP protocol. The result was successful deployments for both companies that would not have occurred without the integration.

== Acquisition ==
A combination of Jasomi's technical successes together with its small size and small amount of raised capital resulted in the company becoming attractive to a number of potential acquirers and investors by early 2005. Ultimately, the company sold to Ditech Communications (now itself acquired by Nuance Communications), a US public company based in Silicon Valley in mid-2005 in a deal valued at $24.55M. The acquisition brought benefit to Jasomi's investors and employees, and gave Ditech a credible toehold in the VoIP marketplace. Jasomi's then-CEO, Todd Simpson, went on to become Ditech's CEO a year later.

While the size of the acquisition was well into 8 digits, the returns to investors (many of whom were employees) were at a comparable percentage to those of the largest company in the SBC arena, Acme Packet. The top three pure-play companies in the SBC space at that time, Acme Packet, Kagoor Networks, and Jasomi, have all provided positive returns to their stakeholders. However, many others in the SBC space have not, and several companies succumbed to pressures of the market.

Ultimately, as was the case with several other acquired SBC companies, the attempts to integrate Jasomi's product lines into those of its acquirer were not successful. Ditech continued to market Jasomi's PeerPoint SBC platform, but while under the leadership of CEO Tim Montgomery, neglected to invest in its technical or market development. In the first two years after acquisition, a number of key employees resigned. Ditech closed its Canadian subsidiary in September 2007, terminating most of the remaining Jasomi employees. However, Todd Simpson, Jasomi's CEO from late 2004 through its acquisition, ultimately became CEO of Ditech following Tim Montgomery's departure.
