= FSA Corporation =

Software company in Canada

- Type: Private
- Industry: Computer software Computer Security; Research and development System administration
- Founded: Calgary (August 1, 1989)
- Headquarters: Calgary, Alberta, Canada
- Key people: Dan Freedman, Co-founder and CEO; Maurice Sharp, Co-founder; Paul Scripko, VP Sales; Gary Neill, Management consultant Dean Huxley, CTO; Benjamin Freedman, VP Marketing; Theo de Raadt, Software Developer; Earle Lowe, Software Developer; Nancy Lang, Manager of Customer Relations; Kevin Chmilar, Software Developer
- Products: Load Balancer; PowerBroker; PowerLogin; PowerTelnet; PowerFTP; CipherLink
- Number of employees: 8 (at time of acquisition by McAfee in 1996)

FSA Corporation (formerly Freedman, Sharp, and Associates) developed UNIX and Windows system level software for security and distributed system administration in the 1990s. The company provided the underlying technology basis for software offerings by IBM, Symantec, and McAfee. FSA's best known products were its Load Balancer distributed workload management solution, its PowerBroker secure system administration solution for controlling and auditing the power of root on UNIX networks, and its CipherLink network encryption solution. The company was acquired by McAfee in 1996. The company was a testing ground for Theo de Raadt's ideas concerning open-source software, which led to the OpenBSD operating system. De Raadt was FSA's first non-founding employee.

== History ==
=== Early years ===
The company was founded by Dan Freedman and Maurice Sharp.

From 1989 through the end of 1991, Freedman and Sharp operated FSA as a consulting company, dealing at the driver and administration level with the large computer networks of the day (large in 1990 meant anything more than about 10 computers on a LAN).

In early 1992, Maurice Sharp chose to leave the company, taking a full-time intern position at Apple Computer. Freedman renamed the company from Freedman, Sharp, and Associates to FSA Corporation, and changed its focus from system-administrative consulting to distributed workload management.

Shortly after the departure of Maurice Sharp, Freedman began to assemble materials for a 3-day UNIX security course. The course comprised over 500 pages of materials along with a tape of open source tools for managing the security of a UNIX network. Freedman marketed and taught the course 10 times in 1992 in various North American cities. He cites the course as being an important way of learning the concerns of system administrators, providing the feedback he needed to decide what products and services FSA would offer next.

While the security course phase of FSA's history did not produce any notable products, the course served as an important mechanism by which the company could quickly engage with potential customers, learning their needs and deriving a plan for product development on the basis of what was learned.

=== Load balancer ===
Freedman's graduate work at the University of Calgary had involved the development of a process migration subsystem for networks of Sun Microsystems computers. From 1992 - 1994, the company commercialized that work, developing the company's Load Balancer product, which was a versatile system for distributing batch jobs across the increasingly larger networks of computers emerging at that time. Freedman hired Theo de Raadt as FSA's first employee. De Raadt's programming and architecture competence have since been proven in his OpenBSD operating system project, but at the time FSA Corporation was his first job since graduating from the University of Calgary. In January, 1994, the Load Balancer product line was sold to Unison Tymlabs, which needed a UNIX-based product line ahead of its IPO. Unison has since been absorbed via acquisition by IBM, and the load balancer product line is now sold by IBM.

=== PowerBroker ===
The sale of Load Balancer left the company with staff and cash, but no product. Freedman had developed and marketed a 3-day UNIX security course in 1992, and had developed significant contacts within the banking, defense, and chip-making communities. These customers all had similar problems in managing large UNIX networks, specifically concerning the control and audit of the actions of the systems' administrators. The problem was that the root account used by systems administrators when reconfiguring parts of the system, was able to edit any of the audit trails created by the system. Freedman designed a new product, PowerBroker, that was similar in concept to today's sudo products, but which allowed centralized control and auditing of an entire network even down to the keystroke level, with the logs stored on a dedicated remote computer to which the system administrators typically did not have access. By vetting all access and logging through this remote machine, a secure log could be maintained. The system was ported to over 22 versions of UNIX to accommodate the newer, larger networks with hundreds or thousands of machines. Dean Huxley was responsible for most of the system-level programming on PowerBroker with Kevin Chmilar and Earle Lowe also contributing.

The PowerBroker product line was sold non-exclusively to Raxco and Symark Software (now known as BeyondTrust

- Raxco launched Axent Technologies, as "a division exclusively committed to providing cross-platform, client/server security solutions", and the product was renamed UNIX Privilege Manager (UPM). Axent was subsequently sold to Symantec Corporation, who later spun off UPM and other products as PassGo Technologies, now part of Quest Software.
- BeyondTrust continues to sell the product under the Privilege Management for Unix and Linux name.

=== CipherLink, PowerTelnet, and PowerFTP ===
In 1995, the company began to develop network encryption technologies, again in response to a growing number of similar requests from its customers. Early products in this sphere included PowerTelnet which is comparable to today's ssh, and PowerFTP, which provided encrypted file transfer. In February 1996, Freedman realized that this technology could be generalized, resulting in a general-purpose network encryption solution that would encrypt the traffic of any application, without requiring much, if any, modification to that application. Chmilar, Huxley, and Lowe worked hard to prepare a demonstrable version of this new CipherLink product in time for the Networld+Interop trade show in April, 1996. The product was well received, and became a finalist for the Best Product of Show award at the trade show that year.

=== Growth ===
In early 1995, Paul Scripko joined the company as its first VP of Sales. He and Freedman had met at Unison Tymlabs, where he had assumed responsibility for sales of FSA's Load Balancer product line after its acquisition in 1994. Scripko professionalized FSA's sales machine, and the company immediately began to derive higher revenues from larger customers. Also around this time, Benjamin Freedman (brother of Dan Freedman) began to work part-time as the company's VP of Marketing. Gary Neill was brought on board by Dan Freedman as a management consultant in the Fall of 1995, and remained with the company until its acquisition by McAfee in 1996.

=== Acquisition by McAfee Associates ===
In August, 1996, FSA was acquired by antivirus maker McAfee Associates, which wanted to expand its products from antivirus into the more general security area. The FSA team developed 12 new product lines for McAfee in the following 12 months, including NetCrypto, PCCrypto, WebScan, McAfee Personal Firewall, and a number of other products only some of which were successful. With little interest in UNIX software at that time, McAfee sold the PowerBroker product line to Symark Software (now known as BeyondTrust) in a non-exclusive deal. Ironically, McAfee also sold rights to PowerBroker to Raxco, which was later acquired by arch-rival Symantec. McAfee continued its security expansion with the acquisition of Trusted Information Systems and PGP.

Many of the personnel involved with FSA later joined another of Freedman's high-technology startup company, Jasomi Networks.

=== Investment ===
FSA Corporation was funded without the assistance of venture capital or angel investors. Instead, the company funded itself with customer revenues. The company also benefitted from the IRAP (Industrial Research Assistance Program) program operated by the Government of Canada, and a high-technology tax credit known as SRED available to Canadian companies.
