= NPT =

NPT may refer to:

== Places ==
- Newport State Airport (IATA airport code NPT), Middletown, Rhode Island, USA
- Northville-Placid Trail, New York State, USA
- Neath Port Talbot (npt.gov.uk), Wales, UK
- Nay Pyi Taw, or NPT, the capital of Myanmar

== Law ==
- Treaty on the Non-Proliferation of Nuclear Weapons, since 1970
- Neighbourhood Policing Team, UK

== Groups, Companies, Organizations ==
- Nashville Public Television, or WNPT, a PBS member station licensed to Nashville, Tennessee
- National Philanthropic Trust, offering donor-advised funds
- The NonProfit Times, Morris Plains, New Jersey, USA; a newspaper
- West Atlantic UK (ICAO airline code NPT), British cargo airline

== Science and medicine ==
- NpT ensemble or isothermal–isobaric ensemble
- Nasal provocation test
- Neonatal pediatric transport; see Certified in neonatal pediatric transport
- Nocturnal penile tumescence
- Normalization process theory

== Technology ==
- National pipe thread, US standards
- Nissan NPT-90, a racing car
- Non-pneumatic tire or airless tire

=== Electronics and computing ===
- National Periodic Test, a test of the U.S. Emergency Alert System
- Nested Page Tables, later Rapid Virtualization Indexing, an AMD technology
- IPv6-to-IPv6 Network Prefix Translation (NPTv6)

== Other uses ==
- Nepal Standard Time
- Newport railway station, Melbourne
