= Media release =

Media release may refer to:

- Anti-tromboning, a feature used in telecommunication networks that optimises the use of the access network
- Press release, a press release or press statement

== See also ==
- Screener (promotional)
