= Comcel =

Comcel may refer to:

- Comcel Colombia, a Colombian mobile phone operator, now Claro Colombia
- Comcel Haiti, a Haitian mobile phone operator that operates a TDMA network in Haiti
