= Bernard Fils-Aimé =

Haitian entrepreneur and activist (1953–2020)

- Fils-Aimé in 2009
- Born: 24 May 1953; Petionville, Haiti
- Died: 8 August 2020 (aged 67); Miami, Florida, United States
- Education: Florida International University
- Occupations: Entrepreneur, activist
- Spouse: Marise Piverger (m. 1980)
- Children: 3

Bernard Fils-Aimé (24 May 1953 – 8 August 2020) was a Haitian entrepreneur and activist. He was part of community assistance organizations for Haitians in America, cofounding the Haitian Refugee Center and serving on the board of the Haitian Education & Leadership Program. He also served as the managing director of Comcel Haiti from its founding in 1998 until its sale to Digicel in 2012.

== Early life and activism ==
Bernard Fils-Aimé was the youngest of four children. His father, Camile Fils-Aimé, died soon after Bernard was born. His mother, Uranie Gabriel Fils-Aimé, was the directrice of the Republic of Guatemala Primary School in Petionville. She opposed François Duvalier, and was briefly arrested for criticizing his policies.

Fils-Aimé and his family left Haiti for New York City in 1966. He graduated from John Jay High School in 1971, then studied at Columbia University for two years. He became involved in student activism, and remained active after he left the university. At a Haiti-related event for student organizers, Fils-Aimé met Marise Piverger; they married in 1980 despite her parents' disapproval, and moved to Miami.

In Miami, Fils-Aimé co-founded the Haitian Refugee Center, which organized protests and litigated cases on behalf of detained Haitian refugees.

Fils-Aimé later went back to school, completing his bachelor's degree and a Master of Public Administration from Florida International University. He worked in various administrative positions at Miami-Dade Community College: he was director of placement at the Wolfson campus, and later served as the assistant dean of students. Fils-Aimé was also a member of the Book Distribution Committee for the Miami Book Fair International in 1992, 1993, and 1995.

== Business in Haiti ==
In 1995, Fils-Aimé moved back to Haiti, although he would regularly visit Miami. His first business venture was SabbAimé S.A., an importer and distributor of frozen chicken. Around this time, a group of American investors wanted to start a wireless carrier in Haiti, and approached Fils-Aimé to serve as a local partner. He took part in the license negotiations with the Haitian government, and became the first CEO when the company was inaugurated in 1998 as Comcel Haiti.

He recognized that Comcel faced unique hurdles as one of the few large private enterprises in Haiti. When subscribers complained of being unable to charge their phones, Fils-Aimé would let them charge their phones for free at Comcel headquarters. He also directed Comcel's resources toward philanthropic initiatives; when the company changed its name to Voila, Fils-Aimé became the president of the Voila Foundation.

From 2006 to 2007, he served as the president of the American Chamber of Commerce in Haiti.

Fils-Aimé retired from Voila's management after its sale to Digicel in 2012. He then joined the board of the Haitian Education & Leadership Program. He also served as president of the Trilogy International Foundation, which is associated with Comcel's US parent company.

== Political involvement ==
Fils-Aimé was a close friend of Haitian President René Préval.

In the aftermath of the 2010 Haiti earthquake, Fils-Aimé was critical of the Haitian government's plan to appropriate land for building aid camps; he observed that many political conflicts in Haiti had been triggered by land disputes. He also defended a private-sector-run opinion poll for the 2010–11 Haitian presidential election in the name of transparency, as previous such polls had not been publicly released.

In 2019, Fils-Aimé published an op-ed in the Miami Herald decrying President Jovenel Moïse's responses to the 2018–2019 Haitian protests. The article was reprinted after the Herald erroneously attached a photograph of Reggie Fils-Aimé (the former CEO of the North American division of video game company Nintendo) instead of Bernard Fils-Aimé.

== Personal life ==
He and his wife Marise had three children: daughter Erica and sons Karl and Gerard.

Fils-Aimé died from COVID-19 at the University of Miami Hospital in Miami, Florida, on 8 August 2020, amidst the COVID-19 pandemic in Florida.
