= Anti-tromboning =

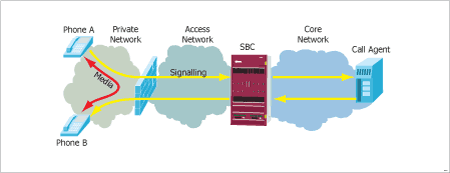
An example of an anti-tromboning measure. While some of the data flows along the long and expensive yellow path, much can be transferred over the shorter and cheaper red path.

Anti-tromboning (also referred to as anti-hairpinning or media release) is a feature employed in telecommunication networks, such as voice over IP networks, that optimises the use of the access network and reduces excess processing and traffic. Tromboning is a type of situation that occurs when data is transferred through a path that goes to a large exchange node and back, much in the way that the path of the sound waves inside a trombone can be elongated by extending the trombone's slide, despite the air entry and exit points remaining the same. For example, in a poorly optimised network a local telephone call may be routed through an international exchange; or internet traffic between an internet user and a website may be needlessly diverted through a data center, adding to latency and costs.

A network border node, such as a session border controller, handling calls as they pass from the access network to the core network can examine the IP address or domains of both the caller and called parties and if they reside in the same part of the network the media path can be released allowing media to flow directly between the two parties without entering the access network. The benefits of this action are twofold: 1) the caller is not paying for any bandwidth usage on the carrier network (but may be arbitrarily paying for the carrier's handoff service) and 2) The carrier's network is less congested.

In mobile networks servicing a large number of geographically dense peers, any two peers who wish to communicate between one another may exchange their media data through a separate path that exploits localised and lower-power transmission, as a form of sub-band signalling. This extends into situations where bulk data can be sent over a less reliable but higher-bandwidth (capacity) and cheaper or faster link, whilst parity data for reconstructing bad packets or supporting determinancy in fuzzy-state weakly determined data can be sent over more reliable but lower-bandwidth and more expensive or more latency-incurring link.

The session and control data can be completely decentralised, removing the tromboned line altogether, under a suitable multiple-input multiple-output (MIMO) network system. In this case, the aggregate media and session control data may be distributed across the network in a dynamic best-possible solution form that meets the link criteria of both the individual peer and the constraints of the network infrastructure (other peers, basestations, etc.), which may vary between each individual peers. A subscription service may primarily support paying members, but allocate a certain amount of under-utilised bandwidth to provide longhaul access to non-paying members, with the assumption that these members will in turn provide paying members with traversal of bulk media data within a geographical area, or even high-latency propagation across cells. The lowered cost to the service provider that results from resource sharing is the economic rationale for these network provision schemes.

== See also ==
- Multicast
- Session border controller
