= Acme Packet =

Acme Packet, Inc.
- Company type: Subsidiary
- Traded as: Nasdaq: APKT
- Industry: Networking hardware
- Founded: August 2000; 25 years ago
- Defunct: 2013
- Fate: Acquired and folded into Oracle Corporation
- Headquarters: Bedford, Massachusetts, United States
- Key people: Andy Ory (CEO); Patrick MeLampy (CTO)
- Products: Session Border Controllers, Multiservice Security Gateways, Session Routing Proxies
- Revenue: ▲US$241 Million (FY 2010)
- Operating income: ▲US$19.2 Million (FY 2009)
- Net income: ▲US$17.1 Million (FY 2009)
- Total assets: ▲US$247 Million (FY 2009)
- Total equity: ▲US$200 Million (FY 2009)
- Number of employees: 761 (Q3 2012)
- Parent: Oracle Corporation
- Website: www.acmepacket.com

Acme Packet, Inc. was a company based in Bedford, Massachusetts that sold session border controllers (SBCs), multi-service security gateways (MSGs), and session routing proxies (SRPs) to service providers and enterprises. A public company incorporated in Delaware, Acme Packet employs over 761 individuals in 31 countries.

In 2002, the Acme Packet Net-Net family of Session Aware Networking products won the SUPERQuest award for most promising IP/application services technology for public networks at SUPERCOMM 2002.

On February 4, 2013, Oracle Corporation announced that it was to acquire Acme Packet for US$2.1 billion. The deal closed in June 2013 and Acme Packet was folded into the Oracle Communications Global Business Unit.
