= Comcel Haiti =

Former telephone company

Communication Cellulaire d'Haïti
- Type: Private
- Industry: Telecommunications
- Founded: 1998
- Headquarters: Port-au-Prince, Haiti
- Key people: Bernard Fils-Aime (managing director)
- Services: Wireless; Telephone
- Parent: Digicel
- Website: www.digicelhaiti.com

Communication Cellulaire d'Haïti, S.A. or (ComCEL), became known as the trademark Voilà, was a telephone company in Haiti which primarily dealt in mobile phone service. It was a subsidiary of US-based Trilogy International Partners.

== History ==
Comcel was awarded a license to construct and operate a nationwide TDMA mobile communications network in September 1998. A year later, in September 1999, Comcel launched commercial service in Port-au-Prince, and had developed the largest mobile phone coverage area in Haiti.

Comcel, at the same time, was also granted the right to build and operate payphone services and planned to have over 500 phones in Port-au-Prince and Jacmel by year-end, with expansion to other provinces in 2006.

In 2002, Comcel was granted the right to operate an international gateway and began carrying international calls in August of that year.

In August 2005, Comcel received a license to operate a nationwide GSM network that launched on October 21 with nationwide coverage under the Voilà GSM brand, which has become its trade name since.

In 2009, Comcel received the U.S. Department of State Award for Corporate Excellence (Multinational).

The company's services temporarily came to halt following the 12 January 2010 Haiti earthquake. While the company's facilities were not seriously affected by the earthquake, 5 of its 575 employees had died and 35 remained missing

The company was sold to Digicel group on March 30, 2012 and ceased to operate independently on October 12, 2012.
