= Network address translation =

Way to traverse IP address spaces without routing

Network address translation between a private network and the Internet

Network address translation (NAT) is a method of mapping an IP address space into another by modifying network address information in the IP header of packets while they are in transit across a traffic routing device. The technique was initially used to bypass the need to assign a new address to every host when a network was moved, or when the upstream Internet service provider was replaced but could not route the network's address space. It is a popular and essential tool in conserving global address space in the face of IPv4 address exhaustion. One Internet-routable IP address of a NAT gateway can be used for an entire private network.

As network address translation modifies the IP address information in packets, NAT implementations may vary in their specific behavior in various addressing cases and their effect on network traffic. Vendors of equipment containing NAT implementations do not commonly document the specifics of NAT behavior.

== History ==
Internet Protocol version 4 (IPv4) uses 32-bit addresses, capable of uniquely addressing about 4.3 billion devices on the network. By 1992, it became evident that this would not be enough. The 1994 RFC 1631 describes NAT as a "short-term solution" to the two most compelling problems facing the Internet Protocol at that time: IP address depletion and scaling in routing. By 2004, NAT had become widespread.

The technique also became known as IP masquerading, which suggests a technique that hides an entire IP address space, usually consisting of private IP addresses, behind a single IP address in another, usually public address space. Because of the popularity of this technique to conserve IPv4 address space, the term NAT became virtually synonymous with IP masquerading.

In 1996, port-address translation (PAT) was introduced, which expanded the translation of addresses to include port numbers.

== Basic NAT ==
The simplest type of NAT provides a one-to-one translation of IP addresses (RFC 1631). RFC 2663 refers to this type of NAT as basic NAT, also called a one-to-one NAT. In this type of NAT, only the IP addresses, IP header checksum, and any higher-level checksums that include the IP address are changed. Basic NAT can be used to interconnect two IP networks with incompatible addresses.

== One-to-many NAT ==
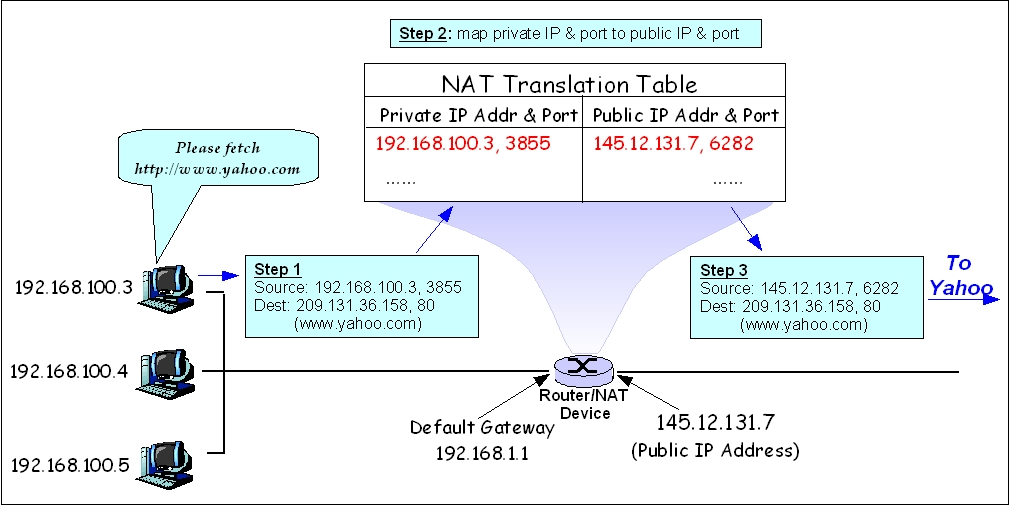
Network address mapping

Most network address translators map multiple private hosts to one publicly exposed IP address.

In a typical configuration, a local network uses one of the designated private IP address subnets (RFC 1918). The network has a router having network interfaces on both the private and the public networks. The public address is typically assigned by an Internet service provider. As traffic passes from the private network to the Internet, NAT translates the source address in each packet from a private address to the router's public address. The NAT facility tracks each active connection. When the router receives inbound traffic from the Internet, it uses the connection tracking data obtained during the outbound phase to determine to which private address it should forward the reply.

Packets passing from the private network to the public network will have their source address modified, while packets passing from the public network back to the private network will have their destination address modified. To avoid ambiguity in how replies are translated, further modifications to the packets are required. The vast bulk of Internet traffic uses Transmission Control Protocol (TCP) or User Datagram Protocol (UDP). For these protocols, the port numbers are changed so that the combination of IP address (within the IP header) and port number (within the Transport Layer header) on the returned packet can be unambiguously mapped to the corresponding private network destination. RFC 2663 uses the term network address and port translation (NAPT) for this type of NAT. Other names include port address translation (PAT), IP masquerading, NAT overload, and many-to-one NAT. This is the most common type of NAT and has become synonymous with the term NAT in common usage.

This method allows communication through the router only when the conversation originates in the private network, since the initial originating transmission establishes the required information in the translation tables. Thus, a web browser within the private network is able to browse websites that are outside the network, whereas web browsers outside the network are unable to browse a website hosted within. (Note: Most NAT devices today allow the network administrator to configure static translation table entries for connections from the external network to the internal masqueraded network. This feature is often referred to as static NAT. It may be implemented in two types: port forwarding which forwards traffic from a specific external port to an internal host on a specified port, and designation of a DMZ host which passes all traffic received on the external interface (on any port number) to an internal IP address while preserving the destination port. Both types may be available in the same NAT device.) Protocols not based on TCP and UDP require other translation techniques.

The primary benefit of one-to-many NAT is mitigation of IPv4 address exhaustion by allowing entire networks to be connected to the Internet using a single public IP address.

== Methods of translation ==
Network address and port translation may be implemented in several ways. Some applications that use IP address information may need to determine the external address of a network address translator. This is the address that its communication peers in the external network detect. Furthermore, it may be necessary to examine and categorize the type of mapping in use, for example, when it is desired to set up a direct communication path between two clients, both of which are behind separate NAT gateways.

For this purpose, RFC 3489 specified the protocol Simple Traversal of UDP over NATs (STUN) in 2003. It classified NAT implementations as full-cone NAT, (address) restricted-cone NAT, port-restricted cone NAT or symmetric NAT, and proposed a methodology for testing a device accordingly. However, these procedures have since been deprecated from standards status, as the methods are inadequate to correctly assess many devices. RFC 5389 standardized new methods in 2008 and the acronym STUN since represents the new title of the specification: Session Traversal Utilities for NAT.

NAT types
Endpoint-Independent NAT, Full Cone NAT, 1:1/one-to-one NAT, or NAT 1: Once an internal address (iAddr:iPort) is mapped to an external address (eAddr:ePort), any packets from iAddr:iPort are sent through eAddr:ePort.; Any external host can send packets to iAddr:iPort by sending packets to eAddr:ePort.
Address-Dependent NAT, Restricted Cone NAT, or NAT 2: Once an internal address (iAddr:iPort) is mapped to an external address (eAddr:ePort), any packets from iAddr:iPort are sent through eAddr:ePort.; An external host (hAddr:any) can send packets to iAddr:iPort by sending packets to eAddr:ePort only if iAddr:iPort has previously sent a packet to hAddr:any. Any means the port number doesn't matter.
Address- and Port-Dependent NAT, Port Restricted Cone NAT, or NAT 3: Once an internal address (iAddr:iPort) is mapped to an external address (eAddr:ePort), any packets from iAddr:iPort are sent through eAddr:ePort.; An external host (hAddr:hPort) can send packets to iAddr:iPort by sending packets to eAddr:ePort only if iAddr:iPort has previously sent a packet to hAddr:hPort.; It is similar to an address restricted cone NAT, but the restriction includes port numbers.
Address- and Port-Dependent NAT, Symmetric NAT, or NAT 4: The combination of one internal IP address and a destination IP address and port is mapped to a single unique external source IP address and port; if the same internal host sends a packet even with the same source address and port but to a different destination, a different mapping is used.; Only an external host that receives a packet from an internal host can send a packet back.

As many NAT implementations combine multiple types, it is better to refer to specific individual NAT behavior instead of using the Cone/Symmetric terminology. RFC 4787 attempts to alleviate confusion by introducing standardized terminology for observed behaviors. For the first bullet in each row of the above table, the RFC would characterize Full-Cone, Restricted-Cone, and Port-Restricted-Cone NATs as having an Endpoint-Independent Mapping, whereas it would characterize a Symmetric NAT as having an Address- and Port-Dependent Mapping. For the second bullet in each row of the above table, RFC 4787 would also label Full-Cone NAT as having an Endpoint-Independent Filtering, Restricted-Cone NAT as having an Address-Dependent Filtering, Port-Restricted Cone NAT as having an Address- and Port-Dependent Filtering, and Symmetric NAT as having either an Address-Dependent Filtering or Address- and Port-Dependent Filtering. Other classifications of NAT behavior mentioned in the RFC include whether they preserve ports, when and how mappings are refreshed, whether external mappings can be used by internal hosts (i.e., its hairpinning behavior), and the level of determinism NATs exhibit when applying all these rules. Specifically, most NATs combine symmetric NAT for outgoing connections with static port mapping, where incoming packets addressed to the external address and port are redirected to a specific internal address and port.

=== NAT mapping vs NAT filtering ===
RFC 4787 distinguishes between NAT mapping and NAT filtering.

Section 4.1 of the RFC covers NAT mapping and specifies the translation of an external IP address and port number into an internal IP address and port number. It defines endpoint-independent mapping, address-dependent mapping and address- and port-dependent mapping, explains that these three possible choices do not relate to the security of the NAT as security is determined by the filtering behavior and then specifies "A NAT MUST have an 'Endpoint-Independent Mapping' behavior."

Section 5 of the RFC covers NAT filtering and describes the criteria used by the NAT to filter packets originating from specific external endpoints. The options are endpoint-independent filtering, address-dependent filtering and address- and port-dependent filtering. Endpoint-independent filtering is recommended where maximum application transparency is required while address-dependent filtering is recommended where more stringent filtering behavior is most important.

Some NAT devices are not compliant with RFC 4787 as they treat NAT mapping and filtering in the same way, so that their configuration option for changing the NAT filtering method also changes the NAT mapping method (e.g., Netgate TNSR).

== Type of NAT and NAT traversal, role of port preservation for TCP ==
NAT traversal problems arise when peers behind different NATs try to communicate. One way to solve this problem is to use port forwarding. Another way is to use various NAT traversal techniques. The most popular technique for TCP NAT traversal is TCP hole punching.

TCP hole punching requires the NAT to follow the port preservation design for TCP. For a given outgoing TCP communication, the same port numbers are used on both sides of the NAT. NAT port preservation for outgoing TCP connections is crucial for TCP NAT traversal because, under TCP, one port can only be used for one communication at a time. Programs that bind distinct TCP sockets to ephemeral ports for each TCP communication make NAT port prediction impossible for TCP.

On the other hand, for UDP, NATs do not need port preservation. Indeed, multiple UDP communications (each with a distinct endpoint) can occur on the same source port, and applications usually reuse the same UDP socket to send packets to distinct hosts. This makes port prediction straightforward, as it is the same source port for each packet.

Furthermore, port preservation in NAT for TCP allows P2P protocols to offer less complexity and less latency because there is no need to use a third party (like STUN) to discover the NAT port since the application itself already knows the NAT port.

However, if two internal hosts attempt to communicate with the same external host using the same port number, the NAT may attempt to use a different external IP address for the second connection or may need to forgo port preservation and remap the port.As of 2006, roughly 70% of the clients in peer-to-peer (P2P) networks employed some form of NAT.

== Implementation ==
=== Establishing two-way communication ===
In bidirectional NAT the session can be established both from inside and outside realms.

Every TCP and UDP packet contains a source port number and a destination port number. Each of those packets is encapsulated in an IP packet, whose IP header contains a source IP address and a destination IP address. The IP address/protocol/port number triple defines an association with a network socket.

For publicly accessible services such as web and mail servers, the port number is important. For example, port 443 connects through a socket to the web server software and port 465 to a mail server's SMTP daemon. The IP address of a public server is also important, similar in global uniqueness to a postal address or telephone number. Both the IP address and port number must be correctly known by all hosts wishing to communicate successfully.

Private IP addresses as described in RFC 1918, are usable only on private networks not directly connected to the Internet. Ports are endpoints of communication unique to that host, so a connection through the NAT device is maintained by the combined mapping of port and IP address. A private address on the inside of the NAT is mapped to an external public address. Port address translation (PAT) resolves conflicts that arise when multiple hosts happen to use the same source port number to establish different external connections at the same time.

=== Translation process ===
With NAT, all communications sent to external hosts actually contain the external IP address and port information of the NAT device instead of internal host IP addresses or port numbers. NAT only translates IP addresses and ports of its internal hosts, hiding the true endpoint of an internal host on a private network.

When a computer on the private (internal) network sends an IP packet to the external network, the NAT device replaces the internal source IP address in the packet header with the external IP address of the NAT device. PAT may then assign the connection a port number from a pool of available ports, (Note: As the NAT router allocates an individual port for each outgoing connection, a huge number of outgoing connections may saturate the range of available ports. As ports typically get freed when the connection doesn't produce any more traffic for a certain time, the maximum number of active connections is limited to approximately 64K.) inserting this port number in the source port field. The packet is then forwarded to the external network. The NAT device then makes an entry in a translation table containing the internal IP address, original source port, and the translated source port. Subsequent packets from the same internal source IP address and port number are translated to the same external source IP address and port number. The computer receiving a packet that has undergone NAT establishes a connection to the port and IP address specified in the altered packet, oblivious to the fact that the supplied address is being translated.

Upon receiving a packet from the external network, the NAT device searches the translation table based on the destination port in the packet header. If a match is found, the destination IP address and port number are replaced with the values found in the table and the packet is forwarded to the inside network. Otherwise, if the destination port number of the incoming packet is not found in the translation table, the packet is dropped or rejected because the PAT device doesn't know where to send it.

== Applications ==
Routing
Network address translation can be used to mitigate IP address overlap. Address overlap occurs when hosts in different networks with the same IP address space try to reach the same destination host. This is most often a misconfiguration and may result from the merger of two networks or subnets, especially when using RFC 1918 private network addressing. The destination host experiences traffic apparently arriving from the same network, and intermediate routers have no way to determine where reply traffic should be sent to. The solution is either renumbering to eliminate overlap or network address translation.

Load balancing
In client–server applications, load balancers forward client requests to a set of server computers to manage the workload of each server. Network address translation may be used to map a representative IP address of the server cluster to specific hosts that service the request.

== Related techniques ==
IEEE Reverse Address and Port Translation (RAPT or RAT) allows a host whose real IP address changes from time to time to remain reachable as a server via a fixed home IP address. Cisco's RAPT implementation is PAT or NAT overloading and maps multiple private IP addresses to a single public IP address. Multiple addresses can be mapped to a single address because each private address is tracked by a port number. PAT uses unique source port numbers on the inside global IP address to distinguish between translations. (Note: The port numbers are 16-bit integers. The total number of internal addresses that can be translated to one external address could theoretically be as high as 65,536 per IP address. Realistically, using non-reserved ephemeral ports and accommodating other system and configuration limitations, the number of ports that can be assigned to a single IP address is lower.) PAT attempts to preserve the original source port. If this source port is already used, PAT assigns the first available port number starting from the beginning of the appropriate port group 0–511, 512–1023, or 1024–65535. When there are no more ports available and there is more than one external IP address configured, PAT moves to the next IP address to try to allocate the original source port again. This process continues until it runs out of available ports and external IP addresses.

Mapping of Address and Port is a Cisco proposal that combines Address plus Port translation with tunneling of the IPv4 packets over an ISP provider's internal IPv6 network. In effect, it is an (almost) stateless alternative to carrier-grade NAT and DS-Lite that pushes the IPv4 address/port translation function (and the maintenance of NAT state) entirely into the existing customer premises equipment NAT implementation. Thus avoiding the NAT444 and statefulness problems of carrier-grade NAT, and also provides a transition mechanism for the deployment of native IPv6 at the same time with very little added complexity.

== Issues and limitations ==
Hosts behind NAT-enabled routers do not have end-to-end connectivity and cannot participate in some internet protocols. Services that require the initiation of TCP connections from the outside network, or that use stateless protocols such as those using UDP, can be disrupted. Unless the NAT router makes a specific effort to support such protocols, incoming packets cannot reach their destination. Some protocols can accommodate one instance of NAT between participating hosts ("passive mode" FTP, for example), sometimes with the assistance of an application-level gateway (see § Applications affected by NAT), but fail when both systems are separated from the internet by NAT. The use of NAT also complicates tunneling protocols such as IPsec because NAT modifies values in the headers, which interfere with the integrity checks done by IPsec and other tunneling protocols.

End-to-end connectivity has been a core principle of the Internet, supported, for example, by the Internet Architecture Board. Current Internet architectural documents observe that NAT is a violation of the end-to-end principle, but that NAT does have a valid role in careful design. There is considerably more concern with the use of IPv6 NAT, and many IPv6 architects believe IPv6 was intended to remove the need for NAT.

An implementation that only tracks ports can be quickly depleted by internal applications that use multiple simultaneous connections, such as an HTTP request for a web page with many embedded objects. This problem can be mitigated by tracking the destination IP address in addition to the port, thus sharing a single local port with many remote hosts. This additional tracking increases implementation complexity and computing resources at the translation device.

Because the internal addresses are all disguised behind one publicly accessible address, it is impossible for external hosts to directly initiate a connection to a particular internal host. Applications such as VOIP, videoconferencing, and other peer-to-peer applications must use NAT traversal techniques to function.

=== Fragmentation and checksums ===
Pure NAT, operating on IP alone, may or may not correctly parse protocols with payloads containing information about IP, such as ICMP. This depends on whether the payload is interpreted by a host on the inside or outside of the translation. Basic protocols such as TCP and UDP cannot function properly unless NAT takes action beyond the network layer.

IP packets have a checksum in each packet header, which provides error detection only for the header. IP datagrams may become fragmented and it is necessary for a NAT to reassemble these fragments to allow correct recalculation of higher-level checksums and correct tracking of which packets belong to which connection.

TCP and UDP have a checksum that covers all the data they carry, as well as the TCP or UDP header, plus a pseudo-header that contains the source and destination IP addresses of the packet carrying the TCP or UDP header. For an originating NAT to pass TCP or UDP successfully, it must recompute the TCP or UDP header checksum based on the translated IP addresses, not the original ones, and put that checksum into the TCP or UDP header of the first packet of the fragmented set of packets.

Alternatively, the originating host may perform path MTU Discovery to determine the packet size that can be transmitted without fragmentation and then set the don't fragment (DF) bit in the appropriate packet header field. This is only a one-way solution, because the responding host can send packets of any size, which may be fragmented before reaching the NAT.

== Variant terms ==
=== DNAT ===
Destination network address translation (DNAT) is a technique for transparently changing the destination IP address of a routed packet and performing the inverse function for any replies. Any router situated between two endpoints can perform this transformation of the packet.

DNAT is commonly used to publish a service located in a private network on a publicly accessible IP address. This use of DNAT is also called port forwarding, or DMZ when used on an entire server, which becomes exposed to the WAN, becoming analogous to an undefended military demilitarized zone (DMZ).

=== SNAT ===
The meaning of the term SNAT varies by vendor:

- source NAT is a common expansion and is the counterpart of destination NAT (DNAT). This is used to describe one-to-many NAT; NAT for outgoing connections to public services.
- stateful NAT is used by Cisco Systems
- static NAT is used by WatchGuard
- secure NAT is used by F5 and by Microsoft (in regard to the ISA Server)

Secure network address translation (SNAT) is part of Microsoft's Internet Security and Acceleration Server and is an extension to the NAT driver built into Microsoft Windows Server. It provides connection tracking and filtering for the additional network connections needed for the FTP, ICMP, H.323, and PPTP protocols as well as the ability to configure a transparent HTTP proxy server.

=== Dynamic network address translation ===
How dynamic NAT works

Dynamic NAT, just like static NAT, is not common in smaller networks but is found within larger corporations with complex networks. Where static NAT provides a one-to-one internal to public static IP address mapping, dynamic NAT uses a group of public IP addresses.

== NAT hairpinning ==
NAT hairpinning, also known as NAT loopback or NAT reflection, is a feature in many consumer routers where a machine on the LAN is able to access another machine on the LAN via the external IP address of the LAN/router (with port forwarding set up on the router to direct requests to the appropriate machine on the LAN). This notion is officially described in 2008, RFC 5128.

The following describes an example network:

- Public address: 203.0.113.1. This is the address of the WAN interface on the router.
- Internal address of router: 192.168.1.1
- Address of the server: 192.168.1.2
- Address of a local computer: 192.168.1.100

If a packet is sent to 203.0.113.1 by a computer at 192.168.1.100, the packet would normally be routed to the default gateway (the router) (Note: Unless an explicit route is set in the computer's routing tables.). A router with the NAT loopback feature detects that 203.0.113.1 is the address of its WAN interface, and treats the packet as if coming from that interface. It determines the destination for that packet, based on DNAT (port forwarding) rules for the destination. If the data were sent to port 80 and a DNAT rule exists for port 80 directed to 192.168.1.2, then the host at that address receives the packet. If no applicable DNAT rule is available, the router drops the packet. An ICMP Destination Unreachable reply may be sent. If any DNAT rules were present, address translation is still in effect; the router still rewrites the source IP address in the packet.

Given the above example of a TCP connection to the server, the local computer initiates the connection by sending a packet from 192.168.1.100 to 203.0.113.1 over the router, and the server receives the packet with this source address and the destination address rewritten by the router (192.168.1.2). Because the source address is part of the same broadcast domain as the server, it will respond with a packet destined directly to the local computer on layer 2, without involving the router. As the local computer did not expect any traffic from 192.168.1.2 (the local address of the server), but from 203.0.113.1, the address that it actually intended to connect to, it will silently drop the response.

To enable two-way communication using the external address between these hosts, an SNAT rule must be configured. Such a rule specifies that traffic received from the local network and destined to the server (to its local address, after rewriting) should have its source address rewritten to an address of the router. This way, the response of the server will be sent to the router, which is then able to apply the reverse SNAT and DNAT transformations and send the expected response back to the local computer. Thus, two-way communication is possible between hosts inside the LAN network via the public IP address, as long as appropriate NAT rules are set up.

== NAT in IPv6 ==
Network address translation is not commonly used in IPv6 because one of the design goals of IPv6 is to restore end-to-end network connectivity. The large addressing space of IPv6 obviates the need to conserve addresses and every device can be given a unique globally routable address. Use of unique local addresses in combination with network prefix translation can achieve results similar to NAT.

The large addressing space of IPv6 can still be defeated, depending on the actual prefix length given by the carrier. It is not uncommon to be handed a /64 prefix – the smallest recommended subnet – for an entire home network, requiring a variety of techniques to be used to manually subdivide the range for all devices to remain reachable. In such cases, it may be required to use full network address and port translation (NAPT) on IPv6, usually referred to as NAT66, where an IPv6 ULA prefix is masqueraded down to a single IPv6 global unique address (GUA). The APNIC blog outlines a case where the author was only provided a single address (/128).

== Applications affected by NAT ==
Some application layer protocols, such as File Transfer Protocol (FTP) and Session Initiation Protocol (SIP), send explicit network addresses within their application data. File Transfer Protocol in active mode, for example, uses separate connections for control traffic (commands) and for data traffic (file contents). When requesting a file transfer, the host making the request identifies the corresponding data connection by its network layer and transport layer addresses. If the host making the request lies behind a simple NAT firewall, the translation of the IP address or TCP port number makes the information received by the server invalid. SIP commonly controls voice over IP calls, and suffer the same problem. SIP and its accompanying Session Description Protocol may use multiple ports to set up a connection and transmit a voice stream via Real-time Transport Protocol. IP addresses and port numbers are encoded in the payload data and must be known before the traversal of NATs. Without special techniques, such as STUN, NAT behavior is unpredictable and communications may fail. Application Layer Gateway (ALG) software or hardware may correct these problems. An ALG software module running on a NAT firewall device updates any payload data made invalid by address translation. ALGs need to understand the higher-layer protocol that they need to fix, and so each protocol with this problem requires a separate ALG. For example, on many Linux systems, there are kernel modules called connection trackers that serve to implement ALGs. However, ALG cannot work if the protocol data is encrypted.

Another possible solution to this problem is to use NAT traversal techniques using protocols such as STUN or Interactive Connectivity Establishment (ICE), or proprietary approaches in a session border controller. NAT traversal is possible in both TCP- and UDP-based applications, but the UDP-based technique is simpler, more widely understood, and more compatible with legacy NATs. In either case, the high-level protocol must be designed with NAT traversal in mind, and it does not work reliably across symmetric NATs or other poorly behaved legacy NATs.

Other possibilities are Port Control Protocol (PCP), NAT Port Mapping Protocol (NAT-PMP), or Internet Gateway Device Protocol but these require the NAT device to implement that protocol.

Most client–server protocols (FTP being the main exception (Note: This issue can be avoided by using SFTP instead of FTP)), however, do not send layer 3 contact information and do not require any special treatment by NATs. In fact, avoiding NAT complications is practically a requirement when designing new higher-layer protocols today.

NATs can also cause problems where IPsec encryption is applied and in cases where multiple devices, such as SIP phones are located behind a NAT. Phones that encrypt their signaling with IPsec encapsulate the port information within an encrypted packet, meaning that NAT devices cannot access and translate the port. In these cases, the NAT devices revert to simple NAT operations. This means that all traffic returning to the NAT is mapped onto one client, causing service to more than one client behind the NAT to fail. There are a couple of solutions to this problem: one is to use TLS, which operates at layer 4 and does not mask the port number; another is to encapsulate the IPsec within UDP – the latter being the solution chosen by TISPAN to achieve secure NAT traversal, or a NAT with "IPsec Passthru" support; another is to use a session border controller to help traverse the NAT.

Interactive Connectivity Establishment (ICE) is a NAT traversal technique that does not rely on ALG support.

The DNS protocol vulnerability announced by Dan Kaminsky on July 8, 2008, is indirectly affected by NAT port mapping. To avoid DNS cache poisoning, it is highly desirable not to translate UDP source port numbers of outgoing DNS requests from a DNS server behind a firewall that implements NAT. The recommended workaround for the DNS vulnerability is to make all caching DNS servers use randomized UDP source ports. If the NAT function de-randomizes the UDP source ports, the DNS server becomes vulnerable.

== Examples of NAT software ==
- Internet Connection Sharing (ICS): NAT & DHCP implementation included with Windows desktop operating systems
- IPFilter: included with (OpenSolaris, FreeBSD and NetBSD, available for many other Unix-like operating systems
- ipfirewall (ipfw): FreeBSD-native packet filter
- Netfilter with iptables/nftables: the Linux packet filter
- NPF: NetBSD-native packet filter
- PF: OpenBSD-native packet filter
- Routing and Remote Access Service (RRAS): routing implementation included with Windows Server operating systems
- VPP: user space packet forwarding implementation for Linux
- WinGate: third-party routing implementation for Windows

== See also ==
- Anything In Anything (AYIYA) – IPv6 over IPv4 UDP, thus working IPv6 tunneling over most NATs
- Carrier-grade NAT – NAT behind NAT within an ISP
- Gateway (telecommunications) – Connection between two network systems
- Internet Gateway Device Protocol (UPnP IGD) NAT-traversal method
- Middlebox – Intermediary box on the data path between a source host and destination host
- NAT Port Mapping Protocol (NAT-PMP) NAT-traversal method
- Port Control Protocol (PCP) NAT-traversal method
- Port triggering – NAT traversal mechanism
- Subnetwork – Logical subdivision of an IP network
- Teredo tunneling – NAT traversal using IPv6
