= IPv6-to-IPv6 Network Prefix Translation =

Internet communications protocol

- Communication protocol
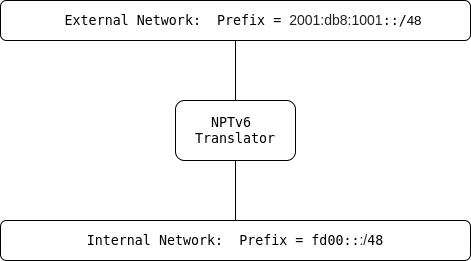
- Purpose: Network address translation
- Introduction: 2011; 15 years ago
- RFC(s): 6296, 7157...

IPv6-to-IPv6 Network Prefix Translation (NPTv6) is a specification for IPv6 to achieve address-independence at the network edge, similar to network address translation (NAT) in Internet Protocol version 4 (IPv4). It has fewer architectural problems than IPv4 NAT; for example, it is stateless, uses a 1:1 address mapping and preserves the reachability attributed to the end-to-end principle. However, because the new address is chosen in a way that leaves the checksum unchanged (checksum-neutral mapping) the interface identifier bits may change when using prefixes smaller than /48, which could break applications that embed data in them (such as IPsec). Additionally, split-horizon DNS may be required for use in a business environment.

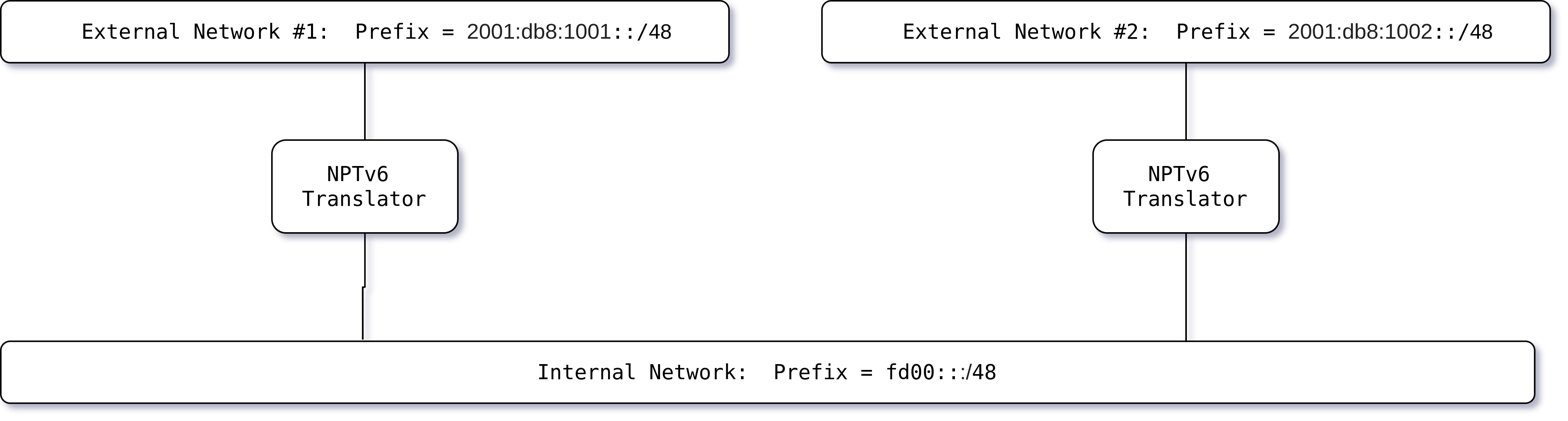
NPTv6 multihoming example

== NAT66 ==
NAT66 was the name used in earlier drafts of the standard. There were some initial proposals to rename it, and a few years later the name NPTv6 was chosen. One of the early versions defined two modes of operation within NAT66: a Two-Way Algorithmic mapping and a Topology Hiding Option, the latter of which used a non-reversible address mapping that would have required additional state in the translator, either in the form of a dynamic table or a statically defined set of address mappings. It was soon removed, leaving the two-way mapping as the only mode of operation and making the specification fully stateless.

Current usage of the term NAT66 is unclear and its meaning differs among vendors and users. Sometimes, it is still being employed as a synonym for NPTv6 or it refers to a generic implementation of stateful NAT involving IPv6. Other times, it refers to full stateful NAPT on IPv6, where an IPv6 ULA prefix is masqueraded down to a single IPv6 global unique address (GUA).
