= International gateway exchange =

Cross-border telephone switch

In telephony, an international gateway exchange is a telephone switch that forms the gateway between a national telephone network and one or more other international gateway exchanges, thus providing cross-border connectivity.

== Requirements ==
Whereas international gateway exchanges are commonly implemented using hardware that could also serve to build a Class 4 (national transit) switch, some of the differences between an international gateway exchange and a Class 4 switch include:

- International variants of signalling protocols, such as International ISUP and #5, in addition to the relevant national signalling protocols.
- Support for echo cancellers.
- Support for DCME
- Support for international accounting and settlement agreements.
- Support for A-law/mu-law transcoding
- High capacity (some of the largest telephone exchanges in the world are international gateway exchanges).
- Support for the numbering plans of each of the countries that may be dialed.
- Advanced traffic routing capabilities, in order to take advantage of the best available tariffs for each destination.

== See also ==
- International gateway
