= Outline of computer security =

Overview of and topical guide to computer security

The following outline is provided as an overview of and topical guide to computer security:

Computer security (also cybersecurity, digital security, or information technology (IT) security) is a subdiscipline within the field of information security. It focuses on protecting computer software, systems, and networks from threats that can lead to unauthorized information disclosure, theft, or damage to hardware, software, or data, as well as to the disruption or misdirection of the services they provide.

The growing significance of computer security reflects the increasing dependence on computer systems, the Internet, and evolving wireless network standards. This reliance has expanded with the proliferation of smart devices, including smartphones, televisions, and other components of the Internet of things (IoT). (yes)

== Essence of computer security ==
Computer security can be described as all of the following:

- a branch of security
- Network security
- application security

== Areas of computer security ==
- Access control – selective restriction of access to a place or other resource. The act of accessing may mean consuming, entering, or using. Permission to access a resource is called authorization.

- Computer access control – includes authorization, authentication, access approval, and audit.

Authentication

- Knowledge-based authentication

- Integrated Windows Authentication

- Password

- Password length parameter
- Secure Password Authentication

- Secure Shell
- Kerberos (protocol)
- SPNEGO
- NTLMSSP
- AEGIS SecureConnect
- TACACS

- Cyber security and countermeasure
- Device fingerprint
  - Physical security – protecting property and people from damage or harm (such as from theft, espionage, or terrorist attacks). It includes security measures designed to deny unauthorized access to facilities, (such as a computer room), equipment (such as your computer), and resources (like the data storage devices, and data, in your computer). If a computer gets stolen, then the data goes with it. In addition to theft, physical access to a computer allows for ongoing espionage, like the installment of a hardware keylogger device, and so on.
- Data security – protecting data, such as a database, from destructive forces and the unwanted actions of unauthorized users.
- Information privacy – relationship between collection and dissemination of data, technology, the public expectation of privacy, and the legal and political issues surrounding them. Privacy concerns exist wherever personally identifiable information or other sensitive information is collected and stored – in digital form or otherwise. Improper or non-existent disclosure control can be the root cause for privacy issues.
  - Internet privacy – involves the right or mandate of personal privacy concerning the storing, repurposing, provision to third parties, and displaying of information pertaining to oneself via the Internet. Privacy can entail either Personally Identifying Information (PII) or non-PII information such as a site visitor's behavior on a website. PII refers to any information that can be used to identify an individual. For example, age and physical address alone could identify who an individual is without explicitly disclosing their name, as these two factors relate to a specific person.
- Mobile security – security pertaining to smartphones, especially with respect to the personal and business information stored on them.
- Network security – provisions and policies adopted by a network administrator to prevent and monitor unauthorized access, misuse, modification, or denial of a computer network and network-accessible resources. Network security involves the authorization of access to data in a network, which is controlled by the network administrator.
  - Network Security Toolkit
  - Internet security – computer security specifically related to the Internet, often involving browser security but also network security on a more general level as it applies to other applications or operating systems on a whole. Its objective is to establish rules and measures to use against attacks over the Internet. The Internet represents an insecure channel for exchanging information leading to a high risk of intrusion or fraud, such as phishing. Different methods have been used to protect the transfer of data, including encryption.
- World Wide Web Security – dealing with the vulnerabilities of users who visit websites. Cybercrime on the Web can include identity theft, fraud, espionage and intelligence gathering. For criminals, the Web has become the preferred way to spread malware.

== Computer security threats ==
Methods of Computer Network Attack and Computer Network Exploitation

Social engineering is a frequent method of attack, and can take the form of phishing, or spear phishing in the corporate or government world, as well as counterfeit websites.

- Password sharing and insecure password practices
- Poor patch management
- Computer crime –
  - Computer criminals –
    - Hackers – in the context of computer security, a hacker is someone who seeks and exploits weaknesses in a computer system or computer network.
      - Password cracking –
      - Software cracking –
      - Script kiddies –
    - List of computer criminals –
  - Identity theft –
- Computer malfunction –
  - Operating system failure and vulnerabilities
  - Hard disk drive failure – occurs when a hard disk drive malfunctions and the stored information cannot be accessed with a properly configured computer. A disk failure may occur in the course of normal operation, or due to an external factor such as exposure to fire or water or high magnetic fields, or suffering a sharp impact or environmental contamination, which can lead to a head crash. Data recovery from a failed hard disk is problematic and expensive. Backups are essential
- Computer and network surveillance –
  - Man in the Middle
  - Loss of anonymity – when one's identity becomes known. Identification of people or their computers allows their activity to be tracked. For example, when a person's name is matched with the IP address they are using, their activity can be tracked thereafter by monitoring the IP address.
    - HTTP Cookie
      - Local Shared Object
      - Web bug
    - Spyware
      - Adware
  - Cyber spying – obtaining secrets without the permission of the holder of the information (personal, sensitive, proprietary or of classified nature), from individuals, competitors, rivals, groups, governments and enemies for personal, economic, political or military advantage using methods on the Internet, networks or individual computers through the use of cracking techniques and malicious software including Trojan horses and spyware. It may be done online from by professionals sitting at their computer desks on bases in far away countries, or it may involve infiltration at home by computer trained conventional spies and moles, or it may be the criminal handiwork of amateur malicious hackers, software programmers, or thieves.
    - Computer and network eavesdropping
      - Lawful Interception
      - War Driving
      - Packet analyzer (aka packet sniffer) – mainly used as a security tool (in many ways, including for the detection of network intrusion attempts), packet analyzers can also be used for spying, to collect sensitive information (e.g., login details, cookies, personal communications) sent through a network, or to reverse engineer proprietary protocols used over a network. One way to protect data sent over a network such as the Internet is by using encryption software.
- Cyberwarfare –
- Exploit – piece of software, a chunk of data, or a sequence of commands that takes advantage of a bug, glitch or vulnerability in order to cause unintended or unanticipated behavior to occur on computer software, hardware, or something electronic (usually computerized). Such behavior frequently includes things like gaining control of a computer system, allowing privilege escalation, or a denial-of-service attack.
  - Trojan
  - Computer virus
  - Computer worm
  - Denial-of-service attack – an attempt to make a machine or network resource unavailable to its intended users, usually consisting of efforts to temporarily or indefinitely interrupt or suspend services of a host connected to the Internet. One common method of attack involves saturating the target machine with external communications requests, so much so that it cannot respond to legitimate traffic, or responds so slowly as to be rendered essentially unavailable.
    - Distributed denial-of-service attack (DDoS) – DoS attack sent by two or more persons.
- Hacking tool
- Malware
  - Computer virus
  - Computer worm
  - Keylogger – program that does keystroke logging, which is the action of recording (or logging) the keys struck on a keyboard, typically in a covert manner so that the person using the keyboard is unaware that their actions are being monitored. There are also HID spoofing hardware keyloggers, like a USB device inserting stored keystores when connected.
  - Rootkit – stealthy type of software, typically malicious, designed to hide the existence of certain processes or programs from normal methods of detection and enable continued privileged access to a computer. The term rootkit is a concatenation of "root" (the traditional name of the privileged account on Unix operating systems) and the word "kit" (which refers to the software components that implement the tool).
  - Spyware
  - Trojan
- Data loss –
  - File deletion –
  - Data loss prevention software
- Natural disasters – fire, flood, etc. can cause loss of computers and data. Either fire or water can cause a hard disk drive failure, for example. Earthquakes can cause a data center to go down. For this reason large web businesses use load balancing and failover techniques to ensure business continuity.
- Payload - malicious code that is delivered to a vulnerable computer, often masquerading as something else
- Physical loss – losing a computer (for example due to fire, or leaving one's laptop on a bus), results in data loss, unless there is a backup.
  - Physical theft – when someone takes property without authorization as his or her own. When a computer is stolen, the data is gone too, unless there is a backup.
    - Laptop theft – stealing a laptop computer. Victims of laptop theft can lose hardware, software, and essential data that has not been backed up. Thieves also may have access to sensitive data and personal information. Some systems authorize access based on credentials stored on the laptop including MAC addresses, web cookies, cryptographic keys and stored passwords.
- Vulnerabilities
  - Exploitable vulnerability – vulnerability for which an exploit exists
  - Open port – TCP or UDP port number that is configured to accept packets. Ports are an integral part of the Internet's communication model — they are the channel through which applications on the client computer can reach the software on the server. Services, such as web pages or FTP, require their respective ports to be "open" on the server in order to be publicly reachable. "Open" (reachable) is not enough for a communication channel to be established. There needs to be an application (service) listening on that port, accepting the incoming packets and processing them. Open ports are vulnerable when there is a service listening and there is no firewall filtering incoming packets to them.
  - Security bug
- Zero-day attack
- Hackers

== Computer defenses and security measures ==
- Access Control Systems
- Authentication
  - Multi-factor authentication
- Authorization
- Firewalls and Internet Security
- Firewall
  - Firewall pinhole
    - NAT hole punching
      - TCP hole punching
      - UDP hole punching
      - ICMP hole punching
  - Next-Generation Firewall
  - Virtual firewall
  - Stateful firewall
  - Context-based access control
  - Dual-homed
  - IPFilter
  - Zone Alarm
  - Linux firewall capabilities
    - Debian
      - Vyatta
        - VyOS
    - BSD Router Project
    - FreeBSD
      - M0n0wall
      - Ipfirewall
      - OPNsense
      - PfSense
- Intrusion detection system
- Intrusion prevention system
- Mobile secure gateway

=== Access control ===
Access control – selective restriction of access to a place or other resource. The act of accessing may mean consuming, entering, or using. Permission to access a resource is called authorization.

- Computer access control – includes authorization, authentication, access approval, and audit.
  - Authorization – function of specifying access rights to computer resources. "To authorize" is to define an access policy. For example, human resources staff is normally authorized to access employee records and this policy is may be formalized as access control rules in a computer system. During operation, the computer system uses the access control rules to decide whether access requests from (authenticated) consumers shall be approved (granted) or disapproved (rejected). Resources include individual files or an item's data, computer programs, computer devices and functionality provided by computer applications. Examples of consumers are computer users, computer programs and other devices attempting to access data that is on a computer.
  - Authentication – act of confirming the identity of a consumer. In this context, a consumer is a computer user, computer program, or other device attempting to access data that is on a computer
    - User account – system ID unique to each user. It allows a user to authenticate (log in) to a system and to be granted authorization to access resources provided by or connected to that system; however, authentication does not imply authorization. To log in to an account, a user is typically required to authenticate oneself with a password or other credentials for the purposes of accounting, security, logging, and resource management.
    - Password – word or string of characters used for user authentication to prove identity or access approval to gain access to a resource (example: an access code is a type of password), which should be kept secret from those not allowed access.
  - Access approval (computer access control) –
  - Audit –
- Physical security – protecting property and people from damage or harm (such as from theft, espionage, or terrorist attacks). It includes security measures designed to deny unauthorized access to facilities, (such as a computer room), equipment (such as your computer), and resources (like the data storage devices, and data, in your computer). If a computer gets stolen, then the data goes with it. In addition to theft, physical access to a computer allows for ongoing espionage, like the installment of a hardware keylogger device, and so on. Examples of physical security system components include:
  - Locks – locks may be used to secure a building or room that a computer is in. They may also be used on computer casings to prevent opening computers to remove or swap out parts, or install unauthorized components. And they may be used on a computer to disallow it from being turned on or used without a physical key. There are also locks to attach cables to laptops to prevent them from being taken.
    - Computer lock –
  - Security alarms –
  - Security barriers – such as fences and walls.
  - Security guards –
  - Theft recovery software – as LoJack is to cars, theft recovery software is to desktop and laptop computers.

=== Application security ===
Application security

- Antivirus software
- Secure coding
- Security by design
- Secure operating systems

=== Data security ===
Data security – protecting data, such as a database, from destructive forces and the unwanted actions of unauthorized users.

=== Information privacy ===
- Information privacy – relationship between collection and dissemination of data, technology, the public expectation of privacy, and the legal and political issues surrounding them. Privacy concerns exist wherever personally identifiable information or other sensitive information is collected and stored – in digital form or otherwise. Improper or non-existent disclosure control can be the root cause for privacy issues.
  - Internet privacy – involves the right or mandate of personal privacy concerning the storing, repurposing, provision to third parties, and displaying of information pertaining to oneself via the Internet. Privacy can entail either Personally Identifying Information (PII) or non-PII information such as a site visitor's behavior on a website. PII refers to any information that can be used to identify an individual. For example, age and physical address alone could identify who an individual is without explicitly disclosing their name, as these two factors relate to a specific person.

=== Mobile security ===
- Mobile security – security pertaining to smartphones, especially with respect to the personal and business information stored on them.

=== Network security ===
- Network security – provisions and policies adopted by a network administrator to prevent and monitor unauthorized access, misuse, modification, or denial of a computer network and network-accessible resources. Network security involves the authorization of access to data in a network, which is controlled by the network administrator.
  - Internet security – computer security specifically related to the Internet, often involving browser security but also network security on a more general level as it applies to other applications or operating systems on a whole. Its objective is to establish rules and measures to use against attacks over the Internet. The Internet represents an insecure channel for exchanging information leading to a high risk of intrusion or fraud, such as phishing. Different methods have been used to protect the transfer of data, including encryption.
    - Virtual private network (VPN) – extends a private network across a public network, such as the Internet. It enables a computer or network-enabled device to send and receive data across shared or public networks as if it were directly connected to the private network, while benefiting from the functionality, security and management policies of the private network. A VPN is created by establishing a virtual point-to-point connection through the use of dedicated connections, virtual tunneling protocols, or traffic encryptions.
      - IPsec – protocol suite for securing Internet Protocol (IP) communications by authenticating and encrypting each IP packet of a communication session. IPsec includes protocols for establishing mutual authentication between agents at the beginning of the session and negotiation of cryptographic keys to be used during the session. IPsec can be used in protecting data flows between a pair of hosts (host-to-host), between a pair of security gateways (network-to-network), or between a security gateway and a host (network-to-host).
      - OpenVPN – open-source software application that implements virtual private network (VPN) techniques for creating secure point-to-point or site-to-site connections in routed or bridged configurations and remote access facilities. It uses a custom security protocol that utilizes SSL/TLS for key exchange. It is capable of traversing network address translators (NATs) and firewalls. It was written by James Yonan and is published under the GNU General Public License (GPL).

=== World Wide Web Security ===
- World Wide Web Security – dealing with the vulnerabilities of users who visit websites. Cybercrime on the Web can include identity theft, fraud, espionage and intelligence gathering. For criminals, the Web has become the preferred way to spread malware.

== History of computer security ==
- Timeline of computer security hacker history

== Computer security industry ==
=== Computer security software ===
- Antivirus software
- Encryption software
  - List of cryptographic file systems
  - Pretty Good Privacy
- Firewall
  - List of router and firewall distributions

=== Testing labs ===
- AV-TEST – independent organization which evaluates and rates antivirus and security suite software for Microsoft Windows and Android operating systems, according to a variety of criteria. Every other month, the researchers publish the results of their testing, where they list which products they awarded their certification. The organisation is based in Magdeburg, in Germany.
- ICSA Labs – independent division of Verizon Business that tests and certifies computer security software (including anti-spyware, anti-virus, and firewall products), for a fee.
- Virus Bulletin – magazine that conducts tests of anti-virus software. The magazine itself is about the prevention, detection and removal of malware and spam. It regularly features analyses of the latest virus threats, articles exploring new developments in the fight against viruses, interviews with anti-virus experts, and evaluations of current anti-malware products.
- West Coast Labs – tests computer security products for a fee. Its Checkmark Certification program reports test results to the public.

=== Computer security companies ===
- McAfee, Inc. (Intel Security) – American global computer security software company headquartered in Santa Clara, California, and the world's largest dedicated security technology company. On February 28, 2011, McAfee became a wholly owned subsidiary of Intel. In early 2014, Intel announced it would rebrand McAfee as Intel Security in 2014.
- Secunia – American computer security company with software offerings in vulnerability management, PC security and patch management.

=== Computer security publications ===
==== Journals and magazines ====
- 2600: The Hacker Quarterly – technical and political articles of interest to the internet security community
- Virus Bulletin – magazine about the prevention, detection and removal of malware and spam. It regularly features analyses of the latest virus threats, articles exploring new developments in the fight against viruses, interviews with anti-virus experts, and evaluations of current anti-malware products.

==== Books on computer security ====
- The Art of Deception
- The Art of Intrusion
- Crypto: How the Code Rebels Beat the Government—Saving Privacy in the Digital Age
- The Cuckoo's Egg: Tracking a Spy Through the Maze of Computer Espionage – 1989 book written by Clifford Stoll. First person account of the hunt for a hacker who broke into a computer at the Lawrence Berkeley National Laboratory.
- Cypherpunks
- Firewalls and Internet Security: Repelling the Wily Hacker
- The Hacker Crackdown
- The Hacker's Handbook
- Hacking: The Art of Exploitation
- Out of the Inner Circle
- The Plot to Hack America
- The Ransomware Hunting Team
- Underground

===== Books on cryptography =====
- Books on cryptography

== Cyber security community ==
=== Cyber security communities ===
- UK cyber security community –

=== Computer security organizations ===
==== Academic ====
- CERIAS – a center for research and education of information security for computing and communication infrastructures located at Purdue University.
- CERT Coordination Center – A program of Carnegie-Mellon University that develops advanced methods and technologies to counter large-scale, sophisticated cyber threats in partnership with other academic programs and with government and law enforcement agencies. The Cert Knowledgebase compiles information on information security incidents.
- Georgia Tech Information Security Center – department of Georgia Tech that deals with information security issues such as cryptography, network security, trusted computing, software reliability, privacy, and internet governance.
- Oulu University Secure Programming Group – studies, evaluates and develops methods of implementing and testing application and system software in order to prevent, discover and eliminate implementation level security vulnerabilities in a pro-active fashion. The focus is on implementation level security issues and software security testing.

==== Commercial ====
- Australian Information Security Association – also known as AISA with paid members in branches located throughout Australia to monitor the condition of information security.
- Microsoft Digital Crimes Unit – a Microsoft sponsored team of international legal and technical experts to stop or interfere with cyber crime and cyber threats.

==== Government agencies ====
- ARNES – Academic and Research Network of Slovenia, which is responsible for development, operation and management of the communication and information network for education and research. It includes the SI-CERT, the Slovenian Computer Emergency Response Team.
- Canadian Cyber Incident Response Centre – also known as CCIRC, a Canadian government program under the Ministry of Public Safety. The program monitors threats, coordinates national responses, and protects national critical infrastructure against cyber incidents.
- Norwegian Cyber Defence Force – the branch of the Norwegian Armed Forces responsible for military communications and offensive and defensive cyberwarfare in Norway.
- The US Department of Defense (DoD) issued DoD Directive 8570 in 2004, supplemented by DoD Directive 8140, requiring all DoD employees and all DoD contract personnel involved in information assurance roles and activities to earn and maintain various industry Information Technology (IT) certifications in an effort to ensure that all DoD personnel involved in network infrastructure defense have minimum levels of IT industry recognized knowledge, skills and abilities (KSA). Andersson and Reimers (2019) report these certifications range from CompTIA's A+ and Security+ through the ICS2.org's CISSP, etc.

===== Law enforcement agencies =====
Internet police – police and secret police departments and other law enforcement agencies in charge of policing the Internet. The major purposes of Internet police, depending on the state, are fighting cybercrime, as well as censorship, propaganda, and monitoring and manipulating the online public opinion.

- Air Force Cyber Command (Provisional) – a proposed U.S. Air Force command that existed in provisional status. On 6 October 2008, the Air Force's cyberspace mission was transferred to USCYBERCOM.
- Department of Defense Cyber Crime Center – also known as DC3, is a United States Department of Defense agency that provides digital forensics support to the DoD and to other law enforcement agencies. DC3's main focus is in criminal, counterintelligence, counterterrorism, and fraud investigations.
- FBI Criminal, Cyber, Response, and Services Branch – also known as CCRSB, is a service within the Federal Bureau of Investigation responsible for investigating certain crimes including all computer-based crime related to counterterrorism, counterintelligence, and criminal threats against the United States.
- FBI Cyber Division – Federal Bureau of Investigation division that heads the national effort to investigate and prosecute internet crimes, including "cyber based terrorism, espionage, computer intrusions, and major cyber fraud." This division of the FBI uses the information it gathers during investigation to inform the public of current trends in cyber crime. It focuses around three main priorities: computer intrusion, identity theft, and cyber fraud. It was created in 2002.
- National Security Agency – The United States Bureau responsible for national cybersecurity and military communications protection.
- US-CERT – also known as the United States Computer Emergency Readiness Team, organization within the Department of Homeland Security's (DHS) National Protection and Programs Directorate (NPPD); a branch of the Office of Cybersecurity and Communications' (CS&C) National Cybersecurity and Communications Integration Center (NCCIC). US-CERT is responsible for analyzing and reducing cyber threats, vulnerabilities, disseminating cyber threat warning information, and coordinating incident response activities.
- USCYBERCOM – is an armed forces sub-unified command subordinate to United States Strategic Command. The unit centralizes command of cyberspace operations, organizes existing cyber resources and synchronizes defense of U.S. military networks.

==== Independent non-profits ====
- Australian Information Security Association – organisation for individuals rather than companies that aims to maintain an unbiased view of information security in Australia. Hosts 2 conferences annually.
- Information Card Foundation – created by Equifax, Google, Microsoft, Novell, Oracle Corporation, PayPal and others, to promote the Information Card approach. Information Cards are personal digital identities that people can use online, and the key component of Identity metasystems.
- Information Systems Security Association –
- International Computer Security Association –
- Internet Watch Foundation –
- OWASP –

===== Independent web-sites =====
- Attrition – information security-related website, updated at least weekly by an all-volunteer staff. The "Errata" section is devoted to pointing out inaccuracies, omissions, and other problems with mainstream media related to computer security and hacking. Additionally, staff members publish opinion pieces such as "Security Rants" pointing out problems with the computer security industry.

== Persons influential in computer security ==
- John McAfee – founded McAfee Associates (later called McAfee, Inc.; Intel Security) in 1987, resigned from the company in 1994. At the DEF CON conference in Las Vegas, Nevada in August 2014, he warned Americans not to use smartphones, suggesting apps are used to spy on clueless consumers who do not read privacy user agreements.
- Ross J. Anderson
- Annie Anton
- Adam Back
- Daniel J. Bernstein
- Stefan Brands
- L. Jean Camp
- Lorrie Cranor
- Cynthia Dwork -- Microsoft Research cryptographer. Among other achievements, responsible for the technology behind bitcoin.
- Deborah Estrin
- Joan Feigenbaum
- Ian Goldberg
- Shafi Goldwasser
- Lawrence A. Gordon
- Peter Gutmann
- Paul Kocher
- Monica S. Lam -- Stanford University computer science professor, director of its MobiSocial Computing Laboratory, involved in Programmable Open Mobile Internet 2020 of the National Science Foundation.
- Brian LaMacchia
- Kevin Mitnick
- Bruce Schneier
- Dawn Song
- Gene Spafford
- Moti Yung—Israeli cryptographer currently at Google research.
- Phil Zimmermann – creator of Pretty Good Privacy (PGP), the predecessor to OpenPGP. He is also known for his work in VoIP encryption protocols, notably ZRTP and Zfone. He was a principal designer of the cryptographic key agreement protocol (the "association model") for the Wireless USB standard.

== See also ==
Rubber-hose cryptanalysis
