= Microsoft engineering groups =

Operating divisions of Microsoft

Microsoft engineering groups are the operating divisions of Microsoft. Starting in April 2002, Microsoft organised itself into seven groups, each an independent financial entity. In September 2005, Microsoft announced a reorganization of its then seven groups into three. In July 2013, Microsoft announced another reorganization into five engineering groups and six corporate affairs groups. A year later, in June 2015, Microsoft reformed into three engineering groups. In September 2016, a new group was created to focus on artificial intelligence and research. On March 29, 2018, a new structure merged all of these into three.

As of 2023, there are four groups:

- Cloud and Artificial Intelligence (Azure, GitHub, Visual Studio, npm, C#, .NET, TS)
- Experiences and Devices (Windows, Microsoft 365, Outlook, Teams, Bing, Edge, Surface, HoloLens)
- Gaming (Xbox, Xbox Game Studios, ZeniMax Media, Activision Blizzard, Game Pass, Cloud Gaming, Xbox network)
- Technologies and Research (Garage, M12, Microsoft Research)

== Experiences + Devices ==
This group produces consumer and enterprise experiences, spanning from Windows products and devices to Microsoft 365 productivity subscription solution. Experiences and Devices is led by Rajesh Jha; Windows and Devices is led by Panos Panay; Office Product Group is led by Joe Belfiore; Web Experiences and Advertising is led by Mikhail Parakhin.

=== Windows + Devices ===
Windows is an operating system by Microsoft. Windows is available in different families, catering to different kinds of devices.

- Windows NT – Windows 11 is the latest OS in this family. It is designed for use in personal computers, 2-in-1 PCs and tablets. As of 2020, Microsoft Windows retained around 75% market share in personal computers and 2-in-1 PCs combined. However, in tablets the market share of Windows is just around 10%.
- Windows IoT – designed specifically for use in IoT scenarios such as on devices where the OS may not directly be visible to the end user; in particular, home appliances, home automation, auto-motives, industry devices etc.
- Windows 10 Mobile, Windows Phone and Windows Mobile – designed for smartphones and small tablets. The last OS in this group viz. Windows 10 Mobile includes all basic consumer features, including Continuum capability. These all have been discontinued.
- Windows 9x – comprises Windows 95, Windows 98 and Windows ME (discontinued).
- Windows 1.0, Windows 2.0 and Windows 3.0 – versions of Windows that were launched from MS-DOS and were not stand-alone operating systems (discontinued).
- Xbox One system software – includes all versions of Windows running on Xbox game consoles.

The Microsoft hardware division is responsible for producing self-branded hardware and various lines of consumer electronics products. They consist of:

- Microsoft Surface – a family of Windows-based personal computing devices, first launched in 2012. It includes the Surface and Surface Pro series of 2-in-1 tablet computers, the Surface Book laptop, the Surface Studio all-in-one PC, and the Surface Hub interactive whiteboard.
- Microsoft HoloLens – a set of augmented reality smartglasses, launched in 2016.
- Xbox – a home gaming console. Many video games for the platform have been developed by the company's Xbox Game Studios subsidiary, in addition to third-party video game publishers such as Electronic Arts and Ubisoft. The first generation launched in 2001 and was succeeded by the Xbox 360 in 2005, the Xbox One in 2013, and Xbox Series X and Series S in 2020.
- Microsoft also produces and sells mice, keyboards, webcams, headsets, game controllers and wireless display adapters. The production of these accessories is outsourced in most cases.

=== Microsoft 365 and Office ===
Microsoft Office is a line of office software, provided by Microsoft. Office includes Word (a word processor), Excel (a spreadsheet program), PowerPoint (a presentation software), OneNote (a notetaking program), Outlook (an email program, frequently used with Exchange Server), OneDrive (a cloud storage and file hosting service) and Teams (a unified communication and collaboration platform). It also encompasses other products (not bundled in Office suite) like Microsoft Access, Microsoft Publisher, Microsoft Project, Microsoft Visio and Microsoft SharePoint. Web services connected via Microsoft accounts such as Outlook.com (a free web-based service previously branded as Hotmail), Outlook on the web, Sway and To Do are also part of Office.

==== Skype ====
Skype was an application that specializes in providing video chat and voice call services. Users can exchange text and video messages, files and images, and create conference calls. Other applications developed alongside Skype are Skype Translator, Skype Qik and GroupMe. Originally launched in 2003, it was bought by Microsoft in 2011 for $8.5 billion, and was retired on May 5, 2025.

=== Web Experiences and Advertising ===
Bing (known previously as Live Search, Windows Live Search, and MSN Search) is a web search engine (advertised as a "decision engine") from Microsoft. As of October 2018, Bing is the third largest search engine globally, with a query volume of 4.58%, behind Google (77%) and Baidu (14.45%). A complete list of search offerings from Bing can be found here. Under Bing, below non-search offerings are also listed:

- Bing Ads – an advertising service that provides pay per click advertising on various search engines.
- Bing Translator – a statistical machine translation platform and web service.
- Bing Webmaster Tools – an online toolbox that allows webmasters to add their websites to the Bing index crawler.
- Cortana – an intelligent personal assistant.
- Microsoft Pulse – an audience response system, it has been used by several major news organisations like CNN, Fox and MSNBC.

MSN is a web portal and related collection of Internet services and apps for Windows and mobile devices, provided by Microsoft. It was launched in August 1995. The current website and suite of apps offered by MSN was first introduced by Microsoft in 2014 as part of a complete redesign and relaunch. The redesign of MSN proved positive and helped increase traffic with an additional ten million daily visitors after two months. MSN is based in the United States and offers international versions of its portal for dozens of countries around the world.

== Cloud + AI ==
This group focuses on building the core foundations. It was originally the Cloud and Enterprise group until March 2018, when it was expanded with the Windows core platform team merged into it. Led by Scott Guthrie.

=== Azure ===
Microsoft Azure is the company's cloud computing platform that hosts virtual machines, websites and more. It provides both platform as a service (PaaS) and infrastructure as a service (IaaS) services and supports many different programming languages, tools and frameworks, including both Microsoft-specific and third-party software and systems. It was launched in 2010. Within the Azure team

- Business AI
- Universal Store and Commerce
- AI Perception and Mixed Reality
- AI Cognitive Services and Platform

=== Visual Studio ===
Microsoft Visual Studio the set of programming tools and compilers. The software product is GUI-oriented and links easily with the Windows APIs but must be specially configured if used with non-Microsoft libraries. Visual Studio supports development for both native Windows platform and .NET Framework. It was launched in 1995.

=== Dynamics ===
Microsoft Dynamics is a line of enterprise resource planning (ERP) and customer relationship management (CRM) software applications. Microsoft Dynamics was previously a separate engineering unit until it got reorganised into the Cloud & Enterprise Group in June 2015.

=== Servers ===
Microsoft Servers (previously called Windows Server System) is a brand that encompasses Microsoft's server products. This includes the Windows Server editions of the Microsoft Windows operating system itself, as well as products targeted at the wider business market. Microsoft's server products are further categorized into four groups namely, Operating systems, Productivity, Security and Microsoft System Center. A complete listing of product offerings can be found here.

In July 2016, Microsoft moved the Windows Server team and its related products to the Windows and Devices Group, further justifying one Windows core across all platforms.

==== Microsoft underwater data center ====
In 2016, Microsoft made plans to operate an experimental underwater server farm off the coast of Orkney. The nitrogen-atmosphere enclosed server farm was actually moved into position under the sea in May 2018, and included 855 servers. Powered exclusively by electricity from the Sun and wind, the server farm operated for two years, until May 2020, when the experiment ended, the enclosed tube was recovered, and brought to the surface for analysis. Preliminary results showed only 8 of the 855 servers failed during the two-year test, a failure rate of just 1/8 that of Microsoft's above ground server farms.

== Technologies + Research ==
This group was created in September 2016 to emphasize the company's presence on artificial intelligence. It was formed when parts of the former Apps and Services group came together with the research team to form a fourth engineering group. Led by Harry Shum.

=== Research ===
Microsoft Research was created with the intent to advance state of the art computing and solve difficult world problems through technological innovation in collaboration with academic, government, and industry researchers.

== See also ==
- Microsoft Digital Crimes Unit
- Microsoft Press
