= Aisa =

Aisa or AISA may refer to:

- Aisa (fate), the Homeric Moira or Atropos, one of the three Fates
- Aisa (portion), an Homeric word similar with Moira (part or portion)
- Aísa, a town in Spain
- Aesa, a town of ancient Macedonia
- Aisa (leafhopper), a leafhopper genus in the tribe Erythroneurini
- Aeronáutica Industrial S.A., a Spanish aeronautical company
- Alabama Independent School Association, which was created to support segregation academies in Alabama
- Aliarcham Academy, a defunct university in Indonesia
- All India Students Association
- American Indian Scouting Association
- American International School, Abu Dhabi
- American International School of Abuja
- American International School of Algiers
- Amnesty International South Africa
- Association of International Schools in Africa
- Australian Information Security Association
