= Syncthing =

Free and open-source peer-to-peer file synchronization application

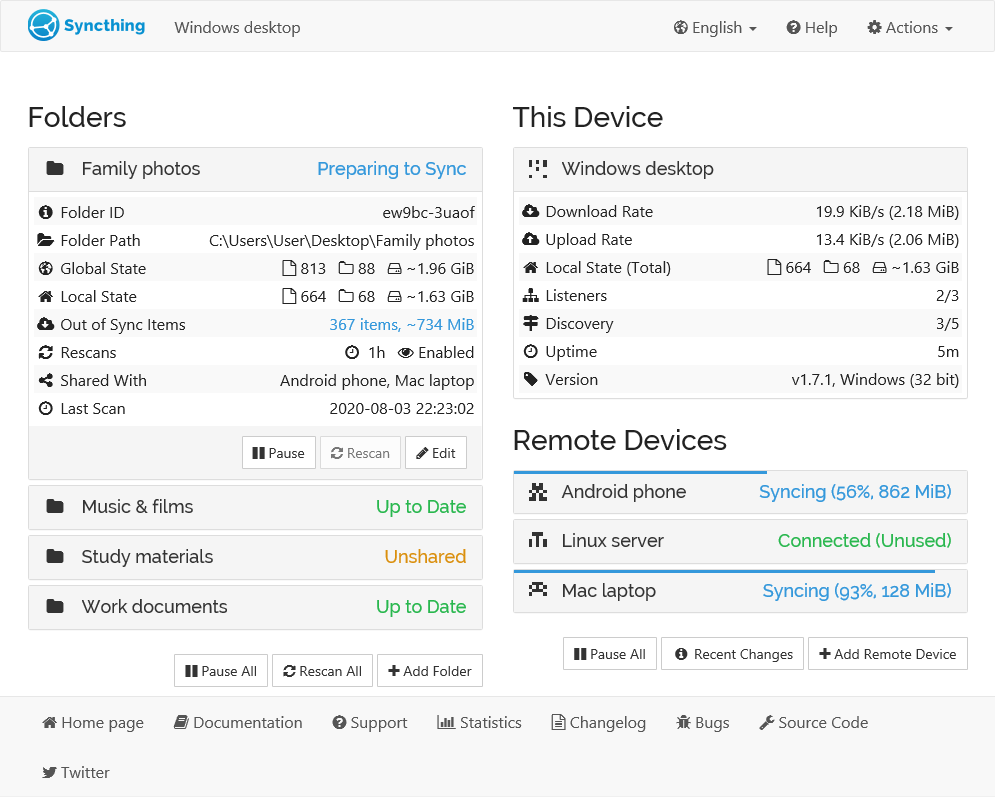
- Syncthing web interface: the synced Folders are on the left and the Devices are on the right
- Original author: Jakob Borg
- Developer: Jakob Borg et al.
- Release: December 15, 2013; 12 years ago
- Stable release: 2.1.5 (8 September 2026; 2 days ago) [±]
- Preview release: 2.1.1-rc.1 (25 May 2026; 3 months ago) [±]
- Written in: Go
- Operating system: Windows, Unix and Unix-like (including Linux, macOS, Android, FreeBSD, OpenBSD, NetBSD, DragonflyBSD, Solaris, illumos, iOS)
- Platform: x86, x86-64, ARM, ARM64, Loong64, MIPS, MIPS 64, PowerPC, RISC-V, IBM zSeries
- Size: 27 MB
- Available in: 62 languages
- List of languages Acoli, Albanian, Albanian (Albania), Arabic, Basque, Belarusian, Bengali, Bulgarian, Catalan, Catalan (Valencian), Chinese, Chinese (China), Chinese (Hong Kong), Chinese (Taiwan), Croatian (Croatia), Czech, Danish, Danish (Denmark), Dutch, English (Australia), English (United Kingdom), Esperanto, Estonian, Finnish, French, French (Canada), Galician, German, Greek, Hebrew (Israel), Hindi, Hungarian, Indonesian, Irish (Ireland), Italian, Japanese, Japanese (Japan), Korean (Korea), Latvian, Lithuanian, Nepali, Norwegian Bokmål, Norwegian Nynorsk, Persian, Polish, Portuguese (Brazil), Portuguese (Portugal), Romanian (Romania), Russian, Serbian, Sinhala, Slovak, Slovak (Slovakia), Slovenian, Spanish, Spanish (Spain), Swedish, Tamil, Turkish, Ukrainian, Vietnamese, Western Frisian
- Type: File synchronization
- License: MPL 2.0
- Website: syncthing.net
- Repository: github.com/syncthing/syncthing

Syncthing is a peer-to-peer file synchronization utility, designed to sync files between devices on a local network or between remote devices over the Internet. It runs on Windows, macOS, Linux, Android, iOS, *BSD and illumos. The software is free and open source, and its version 1.0 was released in 2019 after 5 years in beta.

The Syncthing server runs in the background as a daemon and provides a graphical user interface to the user for configuring the shared folders and devices. The interface is accessed in a web browser using the localhost address http://127.0.0.1:8384. Data security and safety are built into its design with all Syncthing data transfers encrypted using TLS.

== Technology ==
Syncthing is written in Go and implements its own, likewise free Block Exchange Protocol.

Syncthing is a BYO cloud model, running on user-provided hardware. It supports IPv6 and, for those on IPv4 networks, NAT punching and relays. Connecting a device requires explicit approval (except where the Introducer feature is used), which increases the security of the mesh. All data, whether transferred directly between devices or via relays, is encrypted using TLS.

Conflicts are handled by renaming the older file with a "sync-conflict" suffix (along with time stamp), enabling the user to decide how to manage two or more files of the same name that have been changed between syncing. GUI wrappers can use these files to offer the user a method of resolving conflicts without having to resort to manual file handling.

Efficient syncing is achieved via compression of metadata and all transfer data, block re-use, and lightweight scanning for changed files once a full hash has been computed and saved. Syncthing offers send-only and receive-only folder types, in which updates from remote devices are not processed, various types of file versioning (trash can, simple or staggered versioning, and handing versioning to an external program or script), and file/path ignore patterns. Two different SHA256 hash implementations are currently supported, the faster of which is used dynamically after a brief benchmark on startup. Moving and renaming files and folders is handled efficiently, without re-downloading existing data.

== Infrastructure ==
Device discovery is achieved via publicly-accessible discovery servers hosted by the project developers, LAN discovery via broadcast messages, device history, and static host name/addressing. The project also provides the Syncthing Discovery Server program for hosting one's own discovery servers, which can be used alongside or as a replacement for the public servers.

The network of community-contributed relay servers allows devices behind different IPv4 NAT firewalls to communicate by relaying encrypted data via a third party. The relay is similar to the TURN protocol, with the traffic TLS-encrypted end-to-end between devices (thus even the relay server cannot see the data, only the encrypted stream). Private relays can also be set up and configured, with or without public relays, if desired. Syncthing automatically switches from relaying to direct device-to-device connections if it discovers a direct connection has become available.

Syncthing can be used without any connection to the project or community's servers: upgrades, opt-in usage data, discovery and relaying can all be disabled or configured independently, thus the mesh and its infrastructure can all be run in a closed system for privacy or confidentiality.

== Configuration and management ==
Syncthing provides a web-based interface for configuring and monitoring the status, via a web browser either locally (localhost at default port 8384) or remotely (and supports access via proxy server). The interface allows users to choose and manage the folders for sharing and also the devices part of the synchronization. Every computer in Syncthing has a unique Device ID which is used for adding new devices to the syncing network with approval.

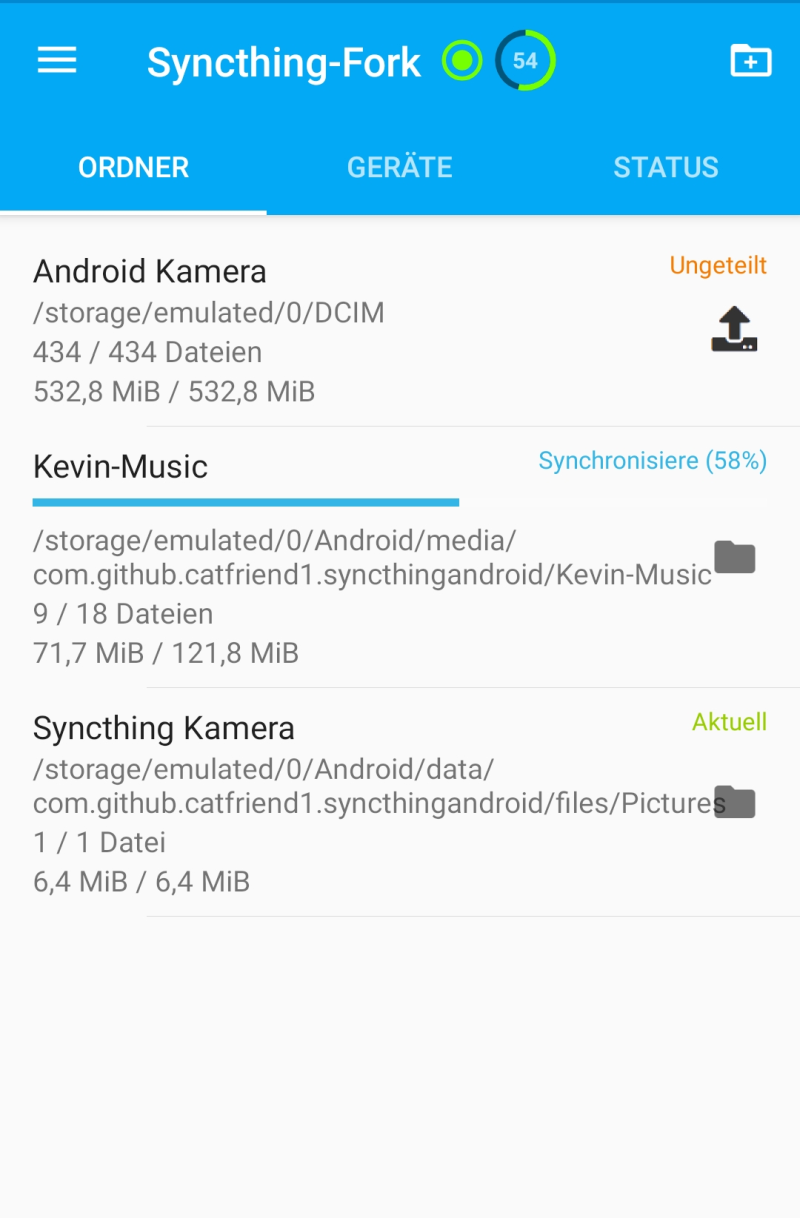
Syncthing-Fork interface on an Android mobile phone

Syncthing is currently directly available for Windows, macOS, Linux, FreeBSD, OpenBSD and illumos platforms. Some platforms no longer have provided prebuilt versions and must be manually compiled. There are also community-contributed Syncthing wrapper programs such as SyncTrayzor for Windows (which runs as a taskbar tray utility), Syncthing-Fork for Android and Möbius Sync for iOS. An official Android client was available on the Google Play Store until 2024.

For more advanced users, it is also possible to edit the Syncthing configuration file directly without using the interface or to use Syncthing using a command-line interface. Links to Docker images are also provided on the community contributions page, as well as links to supported configuration management solutions such as Puppet, Ansible and others.

== Reception ==
In episode 456 of SecurityNow! (recorded in 2014), host Steve Gibson praised Syncthing as a potential open-source replacement for BitTorrent Sync, and again referenced it in episodes 603, 698, 727, and in more detail in episodes 734 and 781.

A reviewer in LWN wrote, in 2021, "Syncthing leaves a favorable impression. The developers seem to have done the work to create a system that is capable, reliable, secure, and which performs reasonably well. But they have also done the work to make it all easy to set up and make use of — the place where a lot of free-software projects seem to fall down. It is an appealing tool for anybody wanting to take control of their data synchronization and replication needs."

== Version history ==
Syncthing version history (part)
Version	Date	Notes
2.0.0	2025-08-12	LevelDB database replaced by SQLite.
1.28.0	2024-10-04	Last version to support Android. Following this release the developer pulled the Android version from the Google Play Store and from the open-source repository F-Droid. Non-official forks continue to be available.
1.25.0	2023-09-25	
1.23.7	2023-07-31	Last version of Syncthing to officially support Windows 7, though Syncthing 1.27.0 is known to work with Windows 7 in an unsupported capacity.
1.20.0	2022-05-04	
1.15.0	2021-04-06	
1.10.0	2020-09-15	Gave users the ability to toggle whether they would like LAN IPs to be broadcast to the global discovery network.
1.9.0	2020-08-28	Introduced the option caseSensitiveFS that allowed users to disable the newly added handling for case insensitive filesystems.
1.8.0	2020-08-07	Adds an experimental folder option that allows users to specify how file changes should be saved on Copy-on-write file systems and also adds TCP hole punching support.
1.5.0	2020-04-21	
1.3.0	2019-10-01	New parameter for adjusting database size.
1.2.0	2019-07-09	Introduces support for a new transport protocol (QUIC), can now perform automatic crash reporting and deprecates small / fixed blocks. 1.2.0 also dropped support for communicating with Syncthing clients that are running 0.14.45 or older.
1.1.3	2019-05-09	Hotfix release to fix a panic bug on Windows.
1.1.1	2019-04-02	Adds support for TLS 1.3.
1.1.0	2019-04-22	Syncthing adopted Go 1.12 and as such loses compatibility with Windows XP and Windows Server 2003. Hashing performance fixed, and user/group ownership follows parent directory.
1.0.0 "Erbium Earthworm"	2019-01-01	The first "stable" release, it had few major changes (the lead developer, stated that it was otherwise identical to 0.14.55-rc.2) but was more of a reflection by the developers on the widespread use of the program and the fact that it had already been in development for almost 5 years at that point. Changes were a limit to max simultaneous scans and to show limit locally changed files for receive only folders. Alongside the 1.0.0 release the team introduced a new semver-like versioning system with the following criteria: A new version which is protocol incompatible with the previous one would constitute as a major version.; A new version which has changes in the REST API or has database or configuration changes which would not allow downgrading would constitute a minor version.; If there are no specific concerns as above, it is a new patch version.
0.14 "Dysprosium Dragonfly"	2016-06-19	New, extensible sync protocol.
0.13 "Copper Cockroach"	2016-05-17	0.13.x separates the folder ids from folder labels. It also now has the ability to serve parts of the file that have already been downloaded to other clients while it is still downloading. 0.13.0 like many of the older releases of Syncthing is incompatible with clients that are running version 0.12.x and below.
0.12 "Beryllium Bedbug"	2015-11-05	Connection Relaying and Device Discovery over HTTPS introduced.
0.11	2015-04-22	Introduced conflict handling, language selection in the UI, CPU usage and syncing speed improvements, Long filename support on Windows, automatic restarting when there is a problem for example the drive being inaccessible, and support for external versioning software. 0.11 is not backwards compatible with older versions of Syncthing. Because of changes to the REST API Syncthing clients that were on 0.10.x wouldn't automatically update to 0.11 as it wasn't compatible with a lot of the 3rd party integrations at the time of its release.
0.2	2013-12-30	Initial public binary release.

== See also ==
- Comparison of file synchronization software
- List of backup software
- Comparison of backup software
