= Pinhole (disambiguation) =

A pinhole is a tiny hole, such as that made by a pin.

Pinhole may also refer to:

- Pinhole (optics), a small hole used as an optical aperture
- Pinhole (band), a rock band from Liverpool, England, later to become The Dead 60s
- Pinhole (song), a song by Japanese rock band Ogre You Asshole
- Firewall pinhole, in computer networking, a port that is opened through a firewall for a particular application
