= Hole punching =

Hole punching may refer to:

- Hole punch, an office tool used to create holes in sheets of paper
- Punch (tool), a hard metal rod with a narrow tip which can be used for forming holes
- Hole punching (networking), a technique in computer networking to establish a connection between two parties behind firewalls
- Hole punching, deallocation of storage space in sparse files, optionally by issuing a TRIM command
