= ZeroTier =

Software company based in California

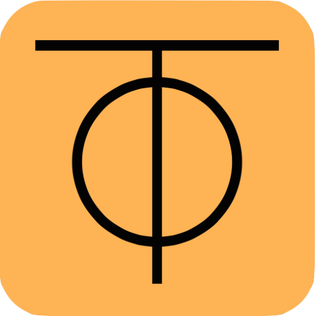
- Type: Private
- Industry: Computer networking; Software-defined networking; Cybersecurity
- Founded: 2013; 13 years ago
- Founder: Adam Ierymenko
- Headquarters: San Francisco, California, United States
- Area served: Worldwide
- Key people: Adam Ierymenko (CTO); Andrew Gault (CEO); Robert Stevenson (CCO)
- Products: ZeroTier One; ZeroTier Quantum
- Website: zerotier.com

ZeroTier, Inc. is a networking software and cybersecurity company with a freemium business model based in San Francisco, California. ZeroTier provides a proprietary network platform and software tools, SDKs, and related commercial products and services to create and manage virtual software-defined networks. The company's flagship end-user product, ZeroTier One, offers a client application that enables devices, such as PCs, phones, servers, routers, and embedded devices to securely connect to zero-trust peer-to-peer virtual networks.

ZeroTier also helps enterprises and public-sector organizations reduce their attack surface by replacing exposed networks with identity-based, end-to-end encrypted connectivity. Devices form direct peer-to-peer connections whenever possible, with optional gateways for controlled access to centralized services or the internet.

In July 2024, ZeroTier announced that it had closed $13.5 million in a Series A funding round, bringing the company's total funding to approximately $15.6 million. The round was led by Battery Ventures, with participation from 7 percent Ventures, Airbridge Equity Partners, Anorak Ventures, Bonfire Ventures, First In Ventures, and Grand Enterprises B.V.

== Software Platform ==
ZeroTier One
- Developers: ZeroTier, Inc.
- Stable release: 1.16.2
- Operating system: Microsoft Windows, macOS, Linux, iOS, Android, FreeBSD, Docker, Linux on ARM
- Type: SD-WAN, P2P, VPN, ZTNA, Mesh network
- License: Business Source License (Free for personal use. Enterprise pricing available); formerly GPLv3
- Website: https://www.zerotier.com

ZeroTier markets proprietary tools, which are licensed under a Business Source License 1.1, intended to support the development and deployment of overlay networks and virtual data centers:

As of 2021, the product line consists of the following primary tools:

- ZeroTier One, first released in 2013, is a portable client application that provides connectivity to ZeroTier-based public or private virtual networks.
- Central, a web-based UI portal for managing ZeroTier networks.

== Clients & Controllers ==
ZeroTier uses a controller–agent architecture in which devices participating in a network run a local software agent, while network membership and configuration are managed by a controller. Agents may be wrapped by a client for a specific operation system or embedded devices, such as edge computing devices or routers. Virtual networks are created and administered through ZeroTier Central's web-based interface, and client software is used to join endpoints to those networks. Every ZeroTier virtual network has a network controller that's responsible for admitting members to the network, issuing certificates, and issuing default configuration information.

Network communication between endpoints is designed to be peer-to-peer and end-to-end encrypted. To establish direct connections between devices located behind network address translation (NAT), ZeroTier uses sophisticated techniques such as STUN and UDP hole punching. Route discovery for direct peer connections is assisted by a global network of root servers, using a mechanism similar to Interactive Connectivity Establishment (ICE) as used in WebRTC. When direct connectivity cannot be established, traffic may be relayed as a fallback.

Virtual networks are created and managed using a ZeroTier controller. Management is done using an API, CLI, or a proprietary web-based UI called (ZeroTier) Central.

== Releases ==
In May 2024, ZeroTier released ZeroTier One version 1.14. In May 2025, ZeroTier announced a range of new enterprise features for the platform, including a freshly redesigned UI, new smart features like ReBAC access, the ZeroTier Partner Program.

Version 1.16 was released in September 2025.

In November 2025, ZeroTier launched its new Central, the next generation of ZeroTier's hosted network controller. It provides a streamlined interface for creating and managing ZeroTier networks, organizing them into groups, and controlling access across an organization.

In March 2026, ZeroTier launched ZeroTier Quantum, an end-to-end quantum-secure networking platform.

== Available Clients & Containers ==
ZeroTier One is available on multiple platforms and in multiple packages:

- Microsoft Windows installer (.msi)
- Apple Macintosh (.pkg)
- iOS for iPhone/iPad/iPod
- Docker
- IoT Stack
- Source code on GitHub
- Linux binaries (DEB & RPM)
- Linux snap package (works across distributions)
- Linux library
- Arch Linux community package
- Android App on Google Play
- Qnap (.qpkg)
- Synology packages (.spk)
- Western Digital MyCloud NAS EX2, EX4, EX2 Ultra (.bin)
- FreeBSD has a port and a package
- OpenWRT has a community-maintained port on GitHub
- MikroTik's RouterOS
- Teltonika Network 's RutOS
- DynFi, a Dynamic Firewalls solution

== See also ==
- LogMeIn Hamachi
- Tailscale
