= William W. Simmons (executive) =

American IBM executive (1912–1997)

William Wilson Simmons (1912 – October 11, 1997) was an IBM executive, who was Director of Strategic Planning for the IBM Corporation in the late 1960s. He is also known as one of the pioneers of applied futures studies in the private sector.

== BIography ==
Simmons had started at IBM as sales manager in the late 1940s. Late 1950s he had made Director of Product Control at the Data Processing Division., and late 1960s he was promoted to Director of Planning Systems at IBM in New York. In this position he published several articles about the "background and philosophy of the IBM Corporate Planning System".

Simmons retired from IBM in 1971/72 after a 25-year career and continued to work as independent Planning consultant. He published several books and articles in the 1970s and in the 1980s he wrote his autobiography about his years at IBM, entitled "Inside IBM: the Watson years : a personal memoir", which shares insides about the History of IBM.

Early 1970s Simmons co-invented a computer system, which they named "the Consensor", an early Audience response system. It was based on the concept "to help participants at business meetings arrive at a consensus and thus save time that otherwise might be spent on unnecessary discussion... The basic components of the Consensor are an opinion-registering system, a computer and a television screen. Participants seated around a conference table are equipped with a personal terminal, about the size of a hand calculator, which can be held comfortably in the lap away from the view of others..."

== Work ==
=== The Consensor ===
One of the industry's very earliest systems of Audience response was the Consensor, developed by Simmons in the early 1970s. In the late 1960s and early 1970s, Simmons had reflected on how unproductive most meetings were. He had become essentially a nonacademic futurist in building up IBM's long-range planning operations. He was one of the pioneers of applied futures studies in the private sector, that is, futures studies applied to corporate planning. Through this work he had met Theodore J. Gordon of The Futures Group (now part of Palladium International).

Gordon had conceived and partially developed what would today be called an audience response system, and Simmons immediately saw practical applications for it in large corporate meetings, to allow people to air their true opinions in anonymous fashion, so that each individual's Likert scale answer value for a question would remain secret, but the group's average, weighted with weighting factors, would be instantly displayed. Thus (something approximating) the group's true consensus would be known, even though individual middle managers or aspiring junior executives would not have to jeopardize their conformity to effect this result. (IBM's organizational culture was famous for its valuing of conformity; and this was common at other firms, too.)

=== Applied Futures, Inc. ===
Simmons retired from IBM in January 1972, and soon after he formed a startup company with Gordon, called Applied Futures, Inc., to develop and market the system, which they called the Consensor [connoting consensus + sensor]. Applied Futures was one of the first audience response companies. In 1972, while Gordon and his assistant Harold S. (Hal) Becker were still working on development, Applied Futures filed for a patent (U.S. patent 3,766,541), which was granted in 1973 with Gordon and Becker as inventors. Another patent, filed for in 1974 and granted in 1976 (U.S. patent 3,947,669), lists Simmons and James A. Marquis. Sales began in 1974.

The Consensor was a system of dials, wires, and three lights; red, yellow, and green. A question was asked verbally and people would turn their dials anywhere from 0 to 10. If the majority agreed, the green lamp would light. If not, either the yellow or red lamp would light, depending on the level of disagreement.

Although business was strong for this fledgling company, the command-and-control management style of the day proved a formidable opponent to this new tool, which promoted consensus building. In his memoir Simmons describes how junior-executive sales prospects tended to like the idea, imagining themselves heroically speaking truth to power (but not paying any price for being a maverick), while their senior-executive bosses tended to see the Consensor as "a blatant attempt to impose democratic procedures into a corporate hierarchy that is anything but democratic." Simmons observed that "A majority of corporations are run as fiefdoms, with the CEO playing the role of Supreme Power; he may be a benevolent dictator, but nonetheless still a dictator." He described this type of senior executives, with ironic tone, as "secure in the knowledge of their own infallibility." Nonetheless, Applied Futures sold plenty of units to business firms and government agencies. In October 1984, it became a subsidiary of Brooks International Corporation, a management consulting firm and was named Brooks Communications Technology International.

In 1986 Brooks International went through a management buyout and the former Applied Futures was spun off as Communications Technology International Incorporated (ComTec). Tom Campione joined the firm in 1992 and oversaw the transition from wired to wireless hardware and from DOS to Windows application software.

In 2004 Campione left and started Audience Response Rentals, LLC a rental service provider. However, in 2006, Campione purchased ComTec the company he had left just 2 years earlier. In 2011, after devastating losses due to the US economic recession, ComTec ceased operations.

== Selected publications ==
Books, a selection:

- 1975. 1974-75 Exploratory Planning Briefs: Planning for the Future by Corporations and Agencies, Domestic and International. Center for Planning & Implementation, American Management Associations, 1975
- 1977. So You Want to Have a Long-range Plan. Planning Forum, 1990
- 1977. Exploratory planning: briefs of practices. Planning Executives Institute
- 1988. Inside IBM: the Watson years : a personal memoir. With Richard B. Elsberry. Dorrance. Recollections of his and IBM's experience from World War II into the 1970s.

Articles, a selection:

- Thoroman, D. G. "Strategic planning in IBM." Long Range Planning 4.1 (1971): 2-6.
- Simmons, W. W. "Practical planning." Long Range Planning 5.2 (1972): 32-39.
- Simmons, W. W. "Issue management-challenge and opportunity for planning executives." Strategy & Leadership 7.6 (1979): 15-18.
