= Bonfire Ventures =

American venture capital company

- Type: Private
- Industry: Venture capital
- Founded: 2017
- Founder: Jim Andelman; Mark Mullen
- Headquarters: Los Angeles, California, U.S.
- Key people: Jim Andelman (co‑founder); Mark Mullen (co‑founder); Brett Queener (partner); Tyler Churchill (partner)
- AUM: >US$1 billion (2025)
- Number of employees: 7 (2022)
- Website: www.bonfirevc.com

Bonfire Ventures is a private venture capital firm based in Los Angeles, California. It invests primarily in seed-stage business-to-business (B2B) software companies. The firm was founded in 2017 by Jim Andelman and Mark Mullen. As of 2025, Bonfire Ventures has more than $1 billion in assets under management across four core funds and related companion and select funds. Its fourth core fund, Bonfire IV, closed at $245 million in 2025.

The firm’s recent investments have included companies developing artificial-intelligence applications for enterprise and professional workflows.

== History and funds ==
Andelman and Mullen began discussing consolidating their investment activities in 2014. At the time, Andelman was leading Rincon Venture Partners, and Mullen owned Double M Partners. In 2017, they formally established Bonfire Ventures to unify their investment efforts into a single institutional fund dedicated to leading seed-stage rounds in B2B software startups. In 2018, Brett Queener, who had held senior roles at Salesforce and Siebel Systems, became a partner. Tyler Churchill joined Bonfire as an intern and became a partner in 2025.

Bonfire Ventures has raised four core funds since its inception. Bonfire I closed in 2018 with US$63 million and invested in approximately 30 early-stage companies, primarily based in Southern California. Early portfolio companies included Spekit, Aforza, Boulevard, a platform for appointment-based businesses, and Postie, which provides direct mail automation software.

Bonfire II was announced in 2020 with approximately $100 million in capital. The fund maintained a portfolio similar in size to that of its predecessor while investing beyond Southern California. Seed-stage investments from Bonfire II include companies such as Cube Software. Bonfire also participated in early financing rounds for Figment and joined the blockchain infrastructure company’s $50 million Series B round in 2021, when Figment was valued at approximately $500 million. In addition to Bonfire II, the firm manages a Select Fund, which focuses on Series B investments in later-stage startups. Notable investments from the Select Fund include ChowNow Inc., a restaurant ordering platform based in Santa Monica, California.

In 2022, Bonfire raised US$168 million for its third core fund, along with US$63 million in a companion opportunity fund, totaling US$231 million. Portfolio companies supported through this fund include Topline Pro, and Rwazi. In 2024, Bonfire participated in a Series A funding round for Supio, an AI-driven legal technology company.

Bonfire IV closed in February 2025 with US$245 million, making it the firm's largest fund to date. It continues the firm's model of backing seed-stage software companies, including businesses integrating artificial intelligence.

During 2025 and 2026, Bonfire led seed rounds for companies developing software for commercial insurance, tax preparation, information-technology support, marketing, and industrial project management.

== Investment approach ==
Bonfire Ventures invests primarily in seed-stage B2B software companies that have begun generating recurring revenue and show early evidence of product-market fit and customer retention. A 2024 Los Angeles Business Journal profile reported that the firm generally looks for companies with approximately $500,000 in annual recurring revenue. Earlier reports placed Bonfire’s initial investments at approximately $2.5 million to $4 million, with Bonfire often acting as lead investor. The firm invests in approximately 25 to 30 companies per fund.

== Portfolio ==
Bonfire Ventures’ portfolio includes companies across sectors such as financial technology, enterprise software, and AI. The firm has made several early-stage investments in AI-focused startups, including Operative Intelligence, a developer of machine-learning tools for business operations, and Rwazi, a data analytics platform leveraging AI to support consumer intelligence in emerging markets. In 2023, Rwazi completed a US$4 million seed round, followed by a US$12 million Series A led by Bonfire Ventures in July 2025.

Other investments in the AI domain include Postie, which uses machine learning for direct-mail marketing optimization, and Topline Pro, a platform that applies generative AI to help small businesses manage digital marketing. Bonfire participated in Topline Pro's US$5 million seed funding round in October 2022, its US$12 million funding round in 2023, and its US$27 million Series B in August 2025.

Investments in software for financial and professional services include Juno, an AI tax-preparation company whose $12 million seed round Bonfire led in 2026, and 1Fort, a commercial-insurance software company whose $7.5 million seed round Bonfire led in 2025. In enterprise infrastructure, Bonfire led the seed round for IT-support automation company Risotto and participated in financing for ZeroTier, a secure-network infrastructure company.

In legal and healthcare software, the firm has invested in Supio, which develops software for legal analysis, and Vali Health, a home-care AI company. Its industrial and workforce-software investments include Ranger AI, a developer of project-management and bidding software, and TeamSense, an SMS-based communications platform for manufacturing workers.

Other portfolio companies include MNTN, Spekit, Cube, and Boulevard. In 2025, Fortune reported more than 50 exits across Bonfire and the founders’ predecessor funds. Reported examples included The Trade Desk; TaxJar, acquired by Stripe in 2021; Openpath, acquired by Motorola Solutions in 2021; Moat, acquired by Oracle; and Scopely, acquired by Savvy Games Group in 2023.

== Operations ==
Bonfire Ventures is managed by co-founders Andelman and Mullen. Queener joined the investment team in 2018 after holding executive positions at Salesforce and serving as president and chief operating officer of SmartRecruiters.

Churchill was promoted to partner in 2025 after more than six years at Bonfire, having initially joined the firm as a summer intern. Jennifer Richard joined Bonfire in 2020 after working in operational positions at early-stage technology companies. She later became a principal specializing in seed-stage investments.

Bonfire generally leads seed-stage rounds and limits the number of companies in each fund. Its partners may take board positions and assist portfolio companies with administrative matters. The firm is headquartered in Los Angeles, while Churchill is based in Seattle.
