= Rwazi =

American Software Company

- Industry: Software
- Founded: 2021
- Founder: Joseph Rutakangwa; Eric Sewankambo
- Headquarters: Los Angeles
- Website: rwazi.com

Rwazi, Inc. is an American artificial intelligence (AI) company based in Los Angeles, California. Founded in 2021, the company specializes in decision intelligence powered by zero-party data. The company helps multinational companies in understanding the consumer market.

== About ==
The company was founded in 2021 by Joseph Rutakangwa and Eric Sewankambo. Their vision was to offer organizations access to consumer insights from global markets.

== How it works ==
The technology operates across three layers: the Signal Layer, the Intelligence Layer, and the Decision Layer. Rwazi gathers directly shared, consent-based signals from individuals through its mobile and web platforms. Its AI engine ingests, validates, and enriches incoming signals and its AI system, Sena, functions as a decision intelligence engine that enables organizations to simulate outcomes, receive high-precision recommendations, and take action. Companies subscribe to the Rwazi for getting the real time data regarding the business transaction.

== Funding ==
The company has recently raised $4 million led by Bonfire Ventures and backed by Newfund, Alumni Ventures and Techstars.

In July 2025, Rwazi announced a $12 million Series A funding round led by Bonfire Ventures, with participation from Santa Barbara Venture Partners, Newfund, and Alumni Ventures.

== Awards ==
- 2021 - Global Startup Awards winner in Commerce Tech Category
- 2023 - Innovator in Trade by L.A. Area Chamber and World Trade Week Southern California Committee.
