= LogMeIn Hamachi =

Virtual private network application

- Screenshot of the Hamachi Client, showing a joined network and other users who are participating
- Original author: Alex Pankratov
- Developer: GoTo (US company)
- Release: 2004
- Stable release: 2.3.0.111 (Windows) / April 18, 2024; 2 years ago
- Operating system: Microsoft Windows (XP or later), macOS, Linux, Linux on ARM (beta)
- Type: P2P, VPN
- License: Proprietary (Free of charge for up to 5 devices)
- Website: www.vpn.net

LogMeIn Hamachi is a virtual private network (VPN) application developed and released in 2004 by Alex Pankratov. It is capable of establishing direct links between computers that are behind network address translation (NAT) firewalls without requiring reconfiguration (when the user's PC can be accessed directly without relays from the Internet/WAN side). Like other layer 2 VPNs, it establishes a connection over the Internet that emulates the connection that would exist if the computers were connected over a local area network (LAN).

Hamachi became a LogMeIn product after the acquisition of Applied Networking Inc. in 2006. It is currently available as a production version for Microsoft Windows and macOS, as a beta version for Linux, and as a system-VPN-based client compatible with Android and iOS.

== Operational summary ==
Hamachi is a proprietary centrally-managed VPN system, consisting of the server cluster managed by the vendor of the system and the client software, which is installed on end-user devices. Client software adds a virtual network interface to a computer, and it is used for intercepting outbound as well as injecting inbound VPN traffic. Outbound traffic sent by the operating system to this interface is delivered to the client software, which encrypts and authenticates it and then sends it to the destination VPN peer over a specially initiated UDP connection. Hamachi currently handles tunneling of IP traffic including broadcasts and multicast. The Windows version also recognizes and tunnels IPX traffic.

Each client establishes and maintains a control connection to the server cluster. When the connection is established, the client goes through a login sequence, followed by the discovery process and state synchronization. The login step authenticates the client to the server and vice versa. The discovery is used to determine the topology of the client's Internet connection, specifically to detect the presence of NAT and firewall devices on its route to the Internet. The synchronization step brings a client's view of its private networks in sync with other members of these networks.

When a member of a network goes online or offline, the server instructs other network peers to either establish or tear down tunnels to the former. When establishing tunnels between the peers, Hamachi uses a server-assisted NAT traversal technique, similar to UDP hole punching.

Hamachi is frequently used for gaming and remote administration.

== Addressing ==
Each Hamachi client is normally assigned an IP address when it logs into the system for the first time. To avoid conflicting with existing private networks on the client side the normal private IP address blocks 10.0.0.0/8, 172.16.0.0/12 and 192.168.0.0/16 are not used.

The IP address assigned to the Hamachi client is henceforth associated with the client's public crypto key. As long as the client retains its key, it can log into the system and use this IP address. Hamachi creates a single broadcast domain between all clients. This makes it possible to use LAN protocols that rely on IP broadcasts for discovery and announcement services over Hamachi networks.

== See also ==
- GoTo (US company)
- Network address translation (NAT), as defined in RFC 3022
- Pertino
- Private network, as defined in RFC 1918
- Session Traversal Utilities for NAT (STUN), as defined in RFC 8489
- UDP hole punching, another NAT traversal technique
- Virtual Private LAN Service, as defined in RFC 4761 and 4762
- XLink Kai
