= American International School of Abuja =

American International School of Abuja (AISA)
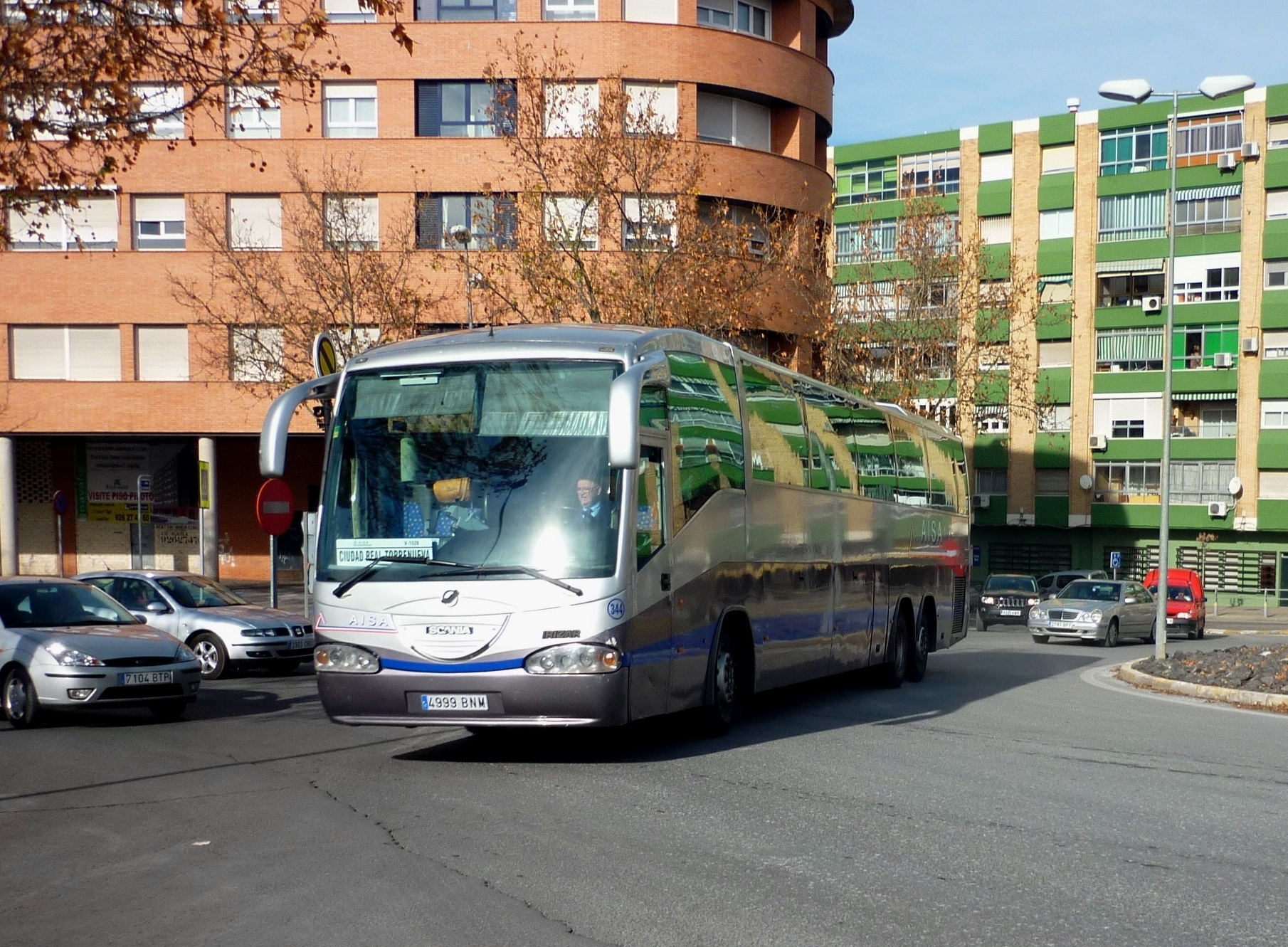

Location
- Plot 346 Cadastral Zone, Durumi District, Abuja FCT; Abuja; Nigeria
- 9.022105°N 7.458758°E

Information
- Type: International School; Non-profit
- Established: 1993
- CEEB code: 630540
- Head of school: Greg Hughes
- Grades: Pre-School - Grade 12
- Gender: Co-educational
- Age range: 3 - 18 years
- Enrollment: 463 (2018)
- Average class size: 22
- Colors: Blue; Black; Silver
- Graduates: 91
- Website: www.aisabuja.org

American International School of Abuja (AISA) is a coeducational international day school in Abuja, Nigeria serving grades Pre-School through Grade 12.

The school year runs from August to June, with 180 student contact days. At the end of the 2015–2016 school year, the student population was 470 spanning from over 40 countries.

== History ==
The American International School of Abuja was founded in 1993 when a group of parents and U.S. Embassy of officials recognized the need for a school that would adequately prepare international and Nigerian students to continue their education under a US-based curriculum.

In the August 2006 school year, the school opened the year in a brand new purpose-built facility with spacious grounds and ample room for growth. The student population rose from 150 students at the close of the 2005 school year to its current enrollment of 470 students, preschool through grade 12.

With the increase in the student population, a full high school program was added and AISA graduated its first senior class in June 2009.

== Governance and organization ==
The school is governed by an elected Board of Governors who oversee the affairs of the school. The Board of Governors is responsible for hiring and evaluating the Head of School who oversees the day-to-day running of the school.

The Elementary School is headed by a Principal as well as an Assistant Principal. The Middle and High School is headed by a Principal. Each division has its support services such as Counselling, English Language Learner, and Learning Support Services.

== Community ==
Some of the events held are the Craft Sale, the International Food Fair, the Fall Carnival, Scavenger Hunts, Nigerian Day, and the AIDS Run/Walk.

== Staff and student body ==
AISA employs the services of 43 expatriate teachers, 6 local teachers, 2 division principals, an assistant principal, a curriculum coordinator, a technology director and an assistant technology director, an athletics director, a business manager, a security manager, a registrar and admissions coordinator, and admin support staff.

At the end of the 2015–16 school year, there were 474 students from nearly 40 countries.

== Facilities ==
- 34 Classrooms
- 2 Music Rooms
- 2 Art Rooms
- Snack bar
- Science Lab
- Library
- Multipurpose Hall
- Computer Lab
- 41 Smartboards
- Elementary School Playground
- Early Childhood Playground
- Swimming Pool

== Technology ==
All classrooms are equipped with an interactive whiteboard and students have access to Macbooks and IPads.

== Academic year ==
The academic year runs from August to June and is made up of 2 semesters. The 1st semester runs from August through December and the 2nd semester runs from January through June.

== Extra-curricular activities ==
AISA provides a wide range of after school activities popularly known as clubs to its early childhood and elementary school students. After school clubs include but are not limited to ballet, gymnastics, cook and bake, karate, mad science, soccer, basketball, and board games.

In the secondary school, AISA offers several activities, including athletics (volleyball, basketball, soccer and swimming), a very active student council and service-learning clubs. Students in athletics have the opportunity to compete in the West African International Schools Activities League where they enjoy travel opportunities to compete with other participating schools in the West African Region.
