= Microsoft Pulse =

Discontinued audience response system

Microsoft Pulse (previously branded as Bing Pulse) is an audience response system from Microsoft. On June 30, 2017, the service was discontinued as a free public service. It is now only available as part of Skype for Business Skype Meeting Broadcast.

Note: the domain https://pulse.microsoft.com is unrelated to the Pulse service and provides news and information for Microsoft Benelux customers.

Bing Pulse is an audience engagement technology for live feedback from audiences of any size, during any event, on any web-enabled device, and on any browser. Bing Pulse gives viewers the ability to respond every five seconds, and as often as they want, to the content they're hearing and seeing. Pulse also gives users the opportunity to have their say in polls and see how others are responding in real time. Bing Pulse was unveiled on February 12, 2013, during Fox's broadcast of the 2013 State of the Union. Since its inception, Bing Pulse has generated more than 35 million votes from participants across the US. Bing Pulse 2.0 was released in beta on December 3, 2014. Notable changes included a self-service option for users to purchase and use Bing Pulse through the product's website, and several product improvements, including sharper consumer graphics and experience; a responsive, multi-device design; and more flexibility in visualizations.

In December 2015 Microsoft announced that they would drop the Bing branding in favour of the general "Microsoft" brand and would integrate other Microsoft services such as OneNote, Skype, Skype for Business and Azure. Alongside the rebranding Microsoft announced that the service would be focused beyond merely real-time voting.

== Features ==
Bing Pulse is available on any device form factor during a meeting or event.

Bing Pulse has both pulsing and polling functions. Pulse is a content rating tool that allows viewers to express their opinion continuously at any moment during a live program or event. Poll questions provide real-time, customizable technology that allows for expanded questioning throughout an event to gain deeper insights and data. Bing Pulse allows unlimited participants and doesn't collect end-users’ personal data. Additional Bing Pulse features include:

- All-in-one real-time voting and polling, social media integration, and immediate visualized insights
- Smart analytics that segment audience data by gender, political affiliation, geography, or other criteria
- Integration into websites, live streams, broadcast channels and Bing.com with embeddable iFrame and API availability
- Negative results are accumulated and highlighted
- No charge to participants using the service
- Video Pulse, an analytics tool that can collect feedback from any recorded video
- Educators can upload recorded class sessions and lectors and say whether or not the attending students can understand it or comprehend key ideas at the time
- Companies can test how potential customers respond to an upcoming advertisement campaign or other digital content through an uploaded video
- Producers can gauge reactions to mobile videos regardless of when the video was viewed

== Usage ==
Bing Pulse was first used in partnership with Fox's broadcast of the 2013 State of the Union. Since then, Bing Pulse has been incorporated into content with several cable news networks, generating more than 35 million audience votes. Today, Bing Pulse is available on a self-serve basis. Anyone in the United States, United Kingdom, and India can set up a Pulse (additional countries will be added soon), and anyone worldwide can participate in a Pulse.

=== CNN ===
On October 21, 2014, Microsoft and CNN announced a partnership to include Bing Pulse as part of CNN's broadcast coverage of the 2014 US elections through to the 2016 Presidential elections. During the 2014 election season, CNN used Bing Pulse in their broadcast of the Florida gubernatorial debate and the New Hampshire U.S. Senatorial Debate. Previously, Bing Pulse had been incorporated into CNN's broadcast of President Obama's National ISIS address and a televised conversation between Bill Clinton and Erin Burnett.

=== FOX ===
Fox built on their momentum from the 2013 State of the Union, opting to use Pulse during the 2014 State of the Union address as well. Additionally, Bing Pulse was a regular feature on Special Report with Bret Baier from July 2013 to January 2014.

=== NBC ===
Pulse was a featured part of MSNBC's The Great Debate series, where the audience was able to vote in real-time during a debate about the NSA held at the 2014 Aspen Ideas Festival. Additionally, CNBC incorporated Bing Pulse into a televised panel session held during the 2014 Clinton Global Initiative annual meeting.

=== Other ===
ABC News included Bing Pulse in its online broadcast of the House Foreign Relations Committee hearing on the Bowe Bergdahl prisoner exchange in June, 2014. CBS News used Bing Pulse in its "50 Years Later" program, a special about the Civil Rights Movement broadcast during July 2014. The Clinton Global Initiative leveraged Bing Pulse during their 2014 CGI University event at Arizona State University.
