= International Computer Security Association =

ICSA Labs (International Computer Security Association) began as NCSA (National Computer Security Association). Its mission was to increase awareness of the need for computer security and to provide education about various security products and technologies.

In its early days, NCSA focused almost solely on the certification of anti-virus software. Using the Consortia model, NCSA worked together with anti-virus software vendors to develop one of the first anti-virus software certification schemes. Over the past decade, the organization added certification programs for other security-related products and changed its name to ICSA Labs.

Operating as an independent division of Verizon, ICSA Labs provides resources for research, intelligence, certification and testing of products, including anti-virus, firewall, IPsec VPN, cryptography, SSL VPN, network IPS, anti-spyware and PC firewall products.

ICSA Labs temporarily ceased operation in April 2017, restoring operations a year later.

ICSA Labs ceased operation in 2022, following closure by its parent company Verizon. This in turn heralded the end of The WildList, a curated collection of computer virus samples, which ICSA Labs managed and distributed within the security industry for testing purposes.
