= Pertino =

- Type: Privately held company
- Industry: Software
- Founded: 2011
- Founder: Craig Elliott, Scott Hankins, Andrew Mastracci, Michael Cartsonis
- Headquarters: Los Gatos, California, United States
- Key people: Craig Elliott (CEO); Scott Hankins (CTO)
- Products: Cloud networking
- Parent: Cradlepoint
- Website: cradlepoint.com/cradlepoint-netcloud

Pertino was a computer networking software company based in Los Gatos, California. In December 2015, Pertino was acquired by Boise, Idaho–based networking company Cradlepoint.

== History ==
Pertino was a Silicon Valley–based startup company founded by Craig Elliott and Scott Hankins. It derived its name from its city of origin, Cupertino, California. Elliott was a former Apple (NSDQ:AAPL) executive who later served as CEO at Packeteer Networks, where he led the company through its acquisition by Blue Coat Systems in 2008. Co-founder and CTO Hankins was the former Director of Engineering at Blue Coat Systems, where he led the software integration of PacketShaper technology into the onboard flight systems of the Northrop Grumman RQ-4 Global Hawk drone. Other founding members include Andrew Mastracci (Architect) and Michael Cartsonis (Former VP of Product and Business Development).

In October 2012, Pertino released a private beta test of its Cloud Network Engine in the Spiceworks online IT community. Also in October, Pertino raised US$ 8.5 million in venture capital from Norwest Venture Partners and Lightspeed Venture Partners, as well as a number of private investors. Pertino secured B-round financing five months later with a $20 million investment from Jafco Ventures.

Pertino introduced its network-as-a-service (NaaS) in February 2013.

In October 2013, Pertino announced its Fall release at the Spiceworld IT conference in Austin, Texas. The release included a redesigned web management dashboard and AppScape, reportedly the industry's first cloud network app store for network services. The company also released its beta version of Pertino for Android, giving visibility to Android devices, in addition to Windows and Mac machines.

In December 2015, Pertino was acquired by Boise, Idaho–based networking company Cradlepoint.

== Products ==
The company developed technology known as a Cloud Network Engine, which combined software-defined networking (SDN) technology with wide-area network (WAN) virtualization, a field now known as SD-WAN. The network engine was hosted in data centers around the world such as Amazon Web Services, Rackspace, and Linode.

Users could deploy a cloud-based network by downloading and installing Pertino's software, and then invite others to join. Users installed software on office resources including file servers, application servers, local printers, or desktops to enable remote connectivity.
