= SMS hubbing =

SMS hubbing is a new structure for the international flow of SMS between operators, reshaping the way that international mobile inter-operability works by implementing hubs to intermediate the SMS traffic and to offer a larger SMS coverage.

The GSM Association (GSMA) found in SMS Hubbing the solution to a problem that limits the continuing growth of international SMS, culminating to the development of the SMS Hubbing trials in 2006, part of the Open Connectivity project. This initiative created a new structure for international SMS interoperability, as well as developed standards and requirements that SMS hubs should follow.

Regardless of the maturity of the operator or number of subscribers, each subscriber expects to be able to send an SMS to other subscribers, regardless of country and mobile network.

== Background ==
The lack of complete international SMS interoperability is caused by the way the GSM world is interconnected: each operator has a need to establish SMS interworking with all other mobile operators, meaning that international SMS can only transit from one operator to another if there is a bi-lateral roaming agreement in place.

While SMS interoperability is limited to bi-lateral interworking / roaming agreements between operators, it is unlikely that full international SMS reach will be achieved by setting up more and more agreements, which are time-consuming and costly to put in place. In addition to that, the revenue benefits of an extra interworking connection might not justify the investment required to set it up in the first place.

SMS hubbing enables a broad international SMS coverage for mobile operators (“client operators”) through the connection to independent hubs, who have multiple agreements in place with other operators, therefore being able to route messages on behalf of the client operators.

SMS Hubbing works with the same concept of voice connectivity model: rather than relying on costly and multiple individual agreements, voice traffic flows via telehouses, which are basically hubs for voice. In the same way, many operators connect to hubs to transit MMS messages, in an attempt to fix the many interoperability problems with this messaging technology. SMS Hubbing is about simplifying the SMS interworking system, by replacing much of the unproductive, identical investments in international agreements made traditionally by mobile operators. As well as this, SMS Hubbing is about providing a higher level of service to SMS, by introducing end-to-end quality of service through Service Level Agreements (SLAs).

It is clear that SMS Hubbing does not replace bilateral agreements. Every operator has the need to establish roaming agreements in order to provide subscribers with the possibility to roam outside their home network. Outside this frame of main roaming agreements that generate the majority of international traffic for voice and messaging, it makes sense for mobile operators to allocate SMS traffic that belongs to non-connected destinations to an SMS hub.

== Benefits ==
With the SMS Hubbing model, an operator looking to increase their international SMS coverage does not need to manage multiple bi-lateral agreements. Mobile operators can simplify this by connecting to a hub. The SMS Hubbing model reduces complexity for operators, as well the cost for SMS interworking agreements. Mobile subscribers also take advantage of an enlarged SMS reach, being able to send and receive message to all countries and networks.

Ubiquity and simplicity in increasing SMS coverage

SMS Hubbing allows operators to manage a single legal, technical and billing relationship rather than hundreds of additional roaming agreements for SMS messaging only.

Mobile operators have been gradually outsourcing non-core functions to invest on areas that need a closer management of the operator, as well as focusing on areas that have a direct interface to customers. The hub concept follows this trend, removing a costly and complex area of technical interface and replacing it with a more efficient and effective outsourced solution.

== Business model ==
Under the GSMA's SMS Hubbing structure, a hub will negotiate a transit fee with an originating operator on a per-SMS basis for the use of the hub. As is the usual practice, the originating operator will also pay a termination fee to the terminating operator, also on a per-SMS basis.

== Other types of hubbing ==
Beyond SMS, hubbing can be applied in different areas, such as MMS. Because of many interoperability problems, many operators generally connect to an MMS hub, which route the messages more efficiently on behalf of the operator.

== See also ==
- Roaming
- SMS
