= UDP hole punching =

NAT technique in computer networking

UDP hole punching is a commonly used technique employed in network address translation (NAT) applications for maintaining User Datagram Protocol (UDP) packet streams that traverse the NAT. NAT traversal techniques are typically required for client-to-client networking applications on the Internet involving hosts connected in private networks, especially in peer-to-peer, Direct Client-to-Client (DCC) and Voice over Internet Protocol (VoIP) deployments.

UDP hole punching establishes connectivity between two hosts communicating across one or more network address translators. Typically, third-party hosts on the public transit network are used to establish UDP port states that may be used for direct communications between the communicating hosts. Once port state has been successfully established and the hosts are communicating, port state may be maintained either by normal communications traffic, or in the prolonged absence thereof, by keep-alive packets, usually consisting of empty UDP packets or packets with minimal, non-intrusive content.

== Overview ==
UDP hole punching is a method for establishing bidirectional UDP connections between Internet hosts in private networks using network address translators. The technique is not applicable in all scenarios or with all types of NATs, as NAT operating characteristics are not standardized.

Hosts with network connectivity inside a private network connected via a NAT to the Internet typically use the Session Traversal Utilities for NAT (STUN) method or Interactive Connectivity Establishment (ICE) to determine the public address of the NAT that its communications peers require. In this process another host on the public network is used to establish port mapping and other UDP port state that is assumed to be valid for direct communication between the application hosts. Since UDP state usually expires after short periods of time in the range of tens of seconds to a few minutes, and the UDP port is closed in the process, UDP hole punching employs the transmission of periodic keep-alive packets, each renewing the life-time counters in the UDP state machine of the NAT.

UDP hole punching will not work with symmetric NAT devices (also known as bi-directional NAT) which tend to be found in large corporate networks. In symmetric NAT, the NAT's mapping associated with the connection to the known STUN server is restricted to receiving data from the known server, and therefore the NAT mapping the known server sees is not useful information to the endpoint.

In a somewhat more elaborate approach both hosts will start sending to each other, using multiple attempts. On a Restricted Cone NAT, the first packet from the other host will be blocked. After that the NAT device has a record of having sent a packet to the other machine, and will let any packets coming from this IP address and port number through. This technique is widely used in peer-to-peer software and Voice over Internet Protocol telephony. It can also be used to assist the establishment of virtual private networks operating over UDP. The same technique is sometimes extended to Transmission Control Protocol (TCP) connections, though with less success because TCP connection streams are controlled by the host OS, not the application, and sequence numbers are selected randomly; thus any NAT device that performs sequence-number checking will not consider the packets to be associated with an existing connection and drop them.

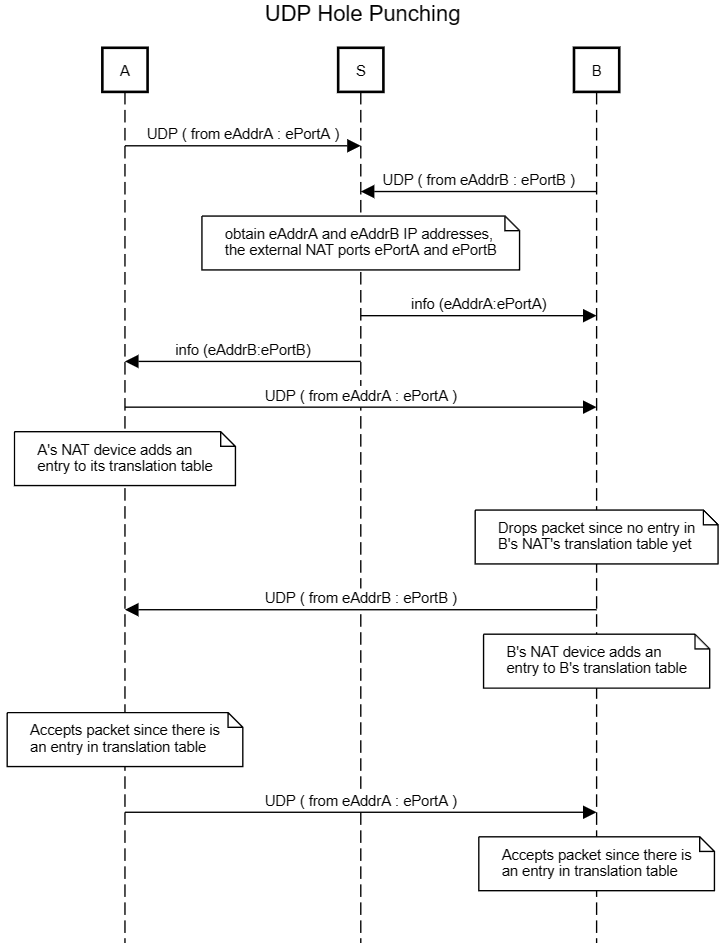
Message sequence chart with peers A and B, using server S to help establish communication

== Flow ==
Let A and B be the two hosts with internal IP addresses iAddr_{A} and iAddr_{B} respectively, each in its own private network; N_{A} and N_{B} are the two NAT devices with external IP addresses eAddr_{A} and eAddr_{B} respectively; S is a public server with a known IP address.

1. A and B each begin a UDP conversation with S; the NAT devices N_{A} and N_{B} create UDP translation states and assign temporary external port numbers ePort_{A} and ePort_{B}.
2. S examines the UDP packets to get the source port used by N_{A} and N_{B} (the external NAT ports ePort_{A} and ePort_{B}).
3. S informs B about the values of eAddr_{A}:ePort_{A} and informs A about the values of eAddr_{B}:ePort_{B}.
4. A sends a packet to eAddr_{B}:ePort_{B} and B sends a packet to eAddr_{A}:ePort_{A} (not necessarily at the same time nor in any particular order).
  - When those packets leave their private network, each NAT device adds an entry to its translation table:
    - N_{A} examines A's packet and finds an entry already exists (iAddr_{A}, iPort_{A}, eAddr_{A}, ePort_{A}) but the destination is different (S) . N_{A} will create a new entry with the same translation for traffic sourced from A ( iAddr_{A}) to B (eAddr_{B}).
    - N_{B} examines B's packet and finds an entry already exists (iAddr_{B}, iPort_{B}, eAddr_{B}, ePort_{B}) but the destination is different (S). N_{B} will create a new entry with the same translation for traffic sourced from B (iAddr_{B}) to A (eAddr_{A}).
  - Depending on the state of each NAT's translation table upon arrival of the remote's packet:
    - If the new entry was already added to N_{A}'s translation table before the arrival of B's packet, then N_{A} passes B's packet, but otherwise drops it.
    - If the new entry was already added to N_{B}'s translation table before the arrival of A's packet, then N_{B} passes A's packet, but otherwise drops it.
5. Once both NAT's have those tuples added, then "holes" have been "punched" in the NATs, allowing both hosts to directly communicate.
- If both hosts have Restricted cone NATs or Symmetric NATs, the external NAT ports will differ from those used with S. On some routers, the external ports are picked sequentially, making it possible to establish a conversation through guessing nearby ports.

== See also ==
- Hamachi
- Hyphanet
- ICMP hole punching
- TCP hole punching
- Hole punching (networking)
- WebRTC
- Port Control Protocol (PCP)
- Teredo tunneling
