= Multimedia telephony =

The 3GPP/NGN IP Multimedia Subsystem (IMS) multimedia telephony service (MMTel) is a global standard based on the IMS, offering converged, fixed and mobile real-time multimedia communication using the media capabilities such as voice, real-time video, text, file transfer and sharing of pictures, audio and video clips. With MMTel, users have the capability to add and drop media during a session. Users can start with chat, add voice (for instance Mobile VoIP), add another caller, add video, share media and transfer files, and drop any of these without losing or having to end the session. MMTel is one of the registered ICSI (IMS Communication Service Identifier) feature tags.

== Description ==
The MMTel standard is a joint project between the 3GPP and ETSI/TISPAN standardization bodies. The MMTel standard is today the only global standard that defines an evolved telephony service that enables real-time multimedia communication with the characteristics of a telephony service over both fixed broadband, fixed narrowband and mobile access types. MMTel also provides a standardized network-to-network interface (NNI). This allow operators to interconnect their networks which in turn enables users belonging to different operators to communicate with each other, using the full set of media capabilities and supplementary services defined within the MMTel service definition.

One of the main differences with the MMTel standard is that, in contrast to legacy circuit switched telephony services, IP transport is used over the mobile access. This means that the mobile access technologies that are in main focus for MMTel are access types such as high-speed packet access (HSPA), 3GPP long-term evolution (LTE) and EDGE Evolution that all are developed with efficient IP transport in mind.

MMTel allows a single SIP session to control virtually all MMTel supplementary services and MMTel media. All available media components can easily be accessed or activated within the session. Employing a single session for all media parts means that no additional sessions need to be set up to activate video, to add new users, or to start transferring a file. Even though it is possible to manage single-session user scenarios with several sessions – for instance, using a circuit-switched voice service that is complemented with a packet-switched video session, a messaging service or both – there are some concrete benefits to MMTel’s single-session approach. A single SIP session in an all-IP environment benefits conferencing; in particular, lip synchronization, which is quite complex when the voice part is carried over a circuit-switched service and the video part is carried over a packet-switched service. In fixed-mobile convergence scenarios, the single-session approach enables all media parts of the multimedia communication solution to interoperate.
