= SLF =

SLF may refer to:

== Businesses and organisations ==
- Seattle Liberation Front, an anti–Vietnam-War organization
- Senate Leadership Fund, a United States Republican-aligned super PAC
- Social Liberal Forum, United Kingdom
- Stephen Lewis Foundation, supports HIV projects in Africa
- Sun Life Financial, Canada

== Places ==
- Shuttle Landing Facility, Kennedy Space Centre, Florida, United States
- Snowshoe Lava Field, a volcanic field in British Columbia, Canada

== Science and technology ==
- Spotted lanternfly, an insect native to Asia
- Subscriber Location Function in IP Multimedia Subsystem
- Super low frequency electromagnetic waves
- Superior longitudinal fasciculus, an association fiber tract in the brain

== Other uses ==
- Stiff Little Fingers, a Northern Irish punk band
- Student loan forgiveness, a policy
- UD SLF, a bus
- Shangri-La Frontier, a Japanese web novel series
