= Fixed mobile substitution =

Fixed mobile substitution, usually abbreviated to FMS, is the use of a mobile phone (cellular phone) instead of a fixed, wired, POTS telephone.

Although strictly, this could simply be as the result of a subscriber making an individual choice (for example, "25% of the population of Finland do not have fixed phones, but use mobiles all the time, even at home"), the term is usually used to describe a deliberate tactic of a carrier to promote such a behavior.

One such technique is the use of "homezones" (where calls on a designated cell, covering the subscriber's home, are at a preferential tariff, or even free). Although very popular with subscribers, and delivering good uptake, these are expensive for carriers, and outside of a few specific countries (e.g. Germany with Genion and Zu Hause services) they are not common.

The use of femtocells promises to be a more attractive (and potentially more profitable) approach.

The term FMS is in contrast to fixed mobile convergence (FMC), which is usually used to describe the use of two different technologies (hence "convergence") to deliver a similar user experience. Examples include the use of dual-mode handsets with both cellular and WiFi technologies and hand-off between the two.
