= IP connectivity access network =

IP-CAN (or IP connectivity access network) is an access network that provides Internet Protocol (IP) connectivity. The term is usually used in cellular context and usually refers to 3GPP access networks such as GPRS or EDGE, but can be also used to describe wireless LAN (WLAN) or DSL networks. It was introduced in 3GPP IP Multimedia Subsystem (IMS) standards as a generic term referring to any kind of IP-based access network as IMS put much emphasis on access and service network separation.

== See also ==
- IP multimedia subsystem
- Radio access network
