= Voice call continuity =

Specification for mobile phone service

The 3GPP has defined the Voice Call Continuity (VCC) specifications in order to describe how a voice call can be persisted, as a mobile phone moves between circuit switched and packet switched radio domains (3GPP TS 23.206).

Many mobile phones are becoming available that support both cellular and other broadband radio technologies. For example, the Nokia N Series and E Series devices support both GSM and WiFi. Similar devices from Sony Ericsson, BlackBerry, Samsung, HTC, Motorola and even the Apple iPhone provide comparable dual mode technology. WiMAX support is also being added and further handsets are emerging from Kyocera and other vendors, which provide dual mode technology in CDMA phones. A wide range of Internet applications can then be accessed from mobile devices using wireless broadband technologies like WiFi and WiMAX. For example, VoIP traffic can be carried over these alternative radio interfaces.

Whereas VoIP calls from mobile devices are controlled by IP infrastructure, according to the VCC specifications, calls to and from a cellular phone in the circuit switched domain are also anchored in an IP domain, for example the IP Multimedia Subsystem (IMS). As the handset becomes attached and detached from wireless access points such as WiFi hotspots, a client application in the device provides notifications of the radio conditions to a VCC platform in the network. This allows circuit switched and IP call legs to be originated and terminated such that the speech path is transferred between domains, transparently to the end user.

This technology is of interest to users as an example of the benefits that are achievable through Fixed Mobile Convergence (FMC). Since most WiFi and WiMAX access points will use fixed backhaul technologies, seamlessly moving between for example WiFi and GSM domains allows the best quality and most cost efficient radio to be used at any given point in time, irrespective of the transport technology used for the media. Similarly, service providers are interested in VCC in order to offer FMC products towards specific market segments, such as enterprise users. Cellular operators in particular can offer bundled services that consist of for example, a broadband connection with a WiFi router and a set of dual mode devices. This supports a Fixed Mobile Substitution (FMS) business case where calls from the office can be carried as VoIP over WiFi and a broadband connection, while VCC technology allows these calls to be seamlessly handed over to cellular networks as the device moves to areas of poor WiFi coverage.

One limitation of VCC however, relates to the focus on voice service. In order to preserve the cellular telephony experience while users are WiFi attached, other features need to be replicated in the packet switched domain. For example, the 3GPP has defined SMS over IP specifications (3GPP TS 23.204) in order to describe how messaging functionality can be provided to end users that are present within IP based access networks. However, over several years a range of other business logic, such as GSM Supplementary Services within the Home Location Register (HLR) has been embedded within cellular networks. This functionality must also be realized within the IP domain in order to provide full service continuity between multiple access networks.

== Evolution ==
In the context of the Release 8 of 3GPP standards, VCC was replaced by a wider concept that covers all services provided by IMS. This work resulted in the specification of IMS Service Continuity and IMS Centralized Services (ICS), which are meant to be used in particular to provide the continuity of voice calls between LTE and legacy 2G/3G networks.

== See also ==
- Handoff
