= List of SIP response codes =

The Session Initiation Protocol (SIP) is a signaling protocol used for controlling communication sessions such as Voice over IP telephone calls. SIP is based on request/response transactions, in a similar manner to the Hypertext Transfer Protocol (HTTP). Each transaction consists of a SIP request (which will be one of several request methods), and at least one response.

SIP requests and responses may be generated by any SIP user agent; user agents are divided into clients (UACs), which initiate requests, and servers (UASes), which respond to them. A single user agent may act as both UAC and UAS for different transactions: for example, a SIP phone is a user agent that will be a UAC when making a call, and a UAS when receiving one. Additionally, some devices will act as both UAC and UAS for a single transaction; these are called Back-to-Back User Agents (B2BUAs).

SIP responses specify a three-digit integer response code, which is one of a number of defined codes that detail the status of the request. These codes are grouped according to their first digit as "provisional", "success", "redirection", "client error", "server error" or "global failure" codes, corresponding to a first digit of 1–6; these are expressed as, for example, "1xx" for provisional responses with a code of 100–199. The SIP response codes are consistent with the HTTP response codes, although not all HTTP response codes are valid in SIP.

SIP responses also specify a "reason phrase", and a default reason phrase is defined with each response code. These reason phrases can be varied, however, such as to provide additional information or to provide the text in a different language.

The SIP response codes and corresponding reason phrases were initially defined in RFC 3261. That RFC also defines a SIP Parameters Internet Assigned Numbers Authority (IANA) registry to allow other RFC to provide more response codes.

This list includes all the SIP response codes defined in IETF RFCs and registered in the SIP Parameters IANA registry as of 27 January 2023. This list also includes SIP response codes defined in obsolete SIP RFCs (specifically, RFC 2543), which are therefore not registered with the IANA; these are explicitly noted as such.

SIP responses may also include an optional Warning header, containing additional details about the response. The Warning contains a separate three-digit code followed by text with more details about the warning. The current list of official warnings is registered in the SIP Parameters IANA registry

== 1xx—Provisional Responses ==
100 Trying
Extended search being performed may take a significant time so a forking proxy must send a 100 Trying response.
180 Ringing
Destination user agent received INVITE, and is alerting user of call.
181 Call is Being Forwarded
Servers can optionally send this response to indicate a call is being forwarded.
182 Queued
Indicates that the destination was temporarily unavailable, so the server has queued the call until the destination is available. A server may send multiple 182 responses to update progress of the queue.
183 Session Progress
This response may be used to send extra information for a call which is still being set up.
199 Early Dialog Terminated
Can be used by User Agent Server to indicate to upstream SIP entities (including the User Agent Client (UAC)) that an early dialog has been terminated.

== 2xx—Successful Responses ==
200 OK
Indicates that the request was successful.
202 Accepted
Indicates that the request has been accepted for processing, but the processing has not been completed. Deprecated.
204 No Notification
Indicates the request was successful, but the corresponding response will not be received.

== 3xx—Redirection Responses ==
300 Multiple Choices
The address resolved to one of several options for the user or client to choose between, which are listed in the message body or the message's Contact fields.
301 Moved Permanently
The original Request-URI is no longer valid, the new address is given in the Contact header field, and the client should update any records of the original Request-URI with the new value.
302 Moved Temporarily
The client should try at the address in the Contact field. If an Expires field is present, the client may cache the result for that period of time.
305 Use Proxy
The Contact field details a proxy that must be used to access the requested destination.
380 Alternative Service
The call failed, but alternatives are detailed in the message body.

== 4xx—Client Failure Responses ==
400 Bad Request
The request could not be understood due to malformed syntax.
401 Unauthorized
The request requires user authentication. This response is issued by UASs and registrars.
402 Payment Required
Reserved for future use.
403 Forbidden
The server understood the request, but is refusing to fulfill it. Sometimes (but not always) this means the call has been rejected by the receiver.
404 Not Found
The server has definitive information that the user does not exist at the domain specified in the Request-URI. This status is also returned if the domain in the Request-URI does not match any of the domains handled by the recipient of the request.
405 Method Not Allowed
The method specified in the Request-Line is understood, but not allowed for the address identified by the Request-URI.
406 Not Acceptable
The resource identified by the request is only capable of generating response entities that have content characteristics but not acceptable according to the Accept header field sent in the request.
407 Proxy Authentication Required
The request requires user authentication. This response is issued by proxies.
408 Request Timeout
Couldn't find the user in time. The server could not produce a response within a suitable amount of time, for example, if it could not determine the location of the user in time. The client MAY repeat the request without modifications at any later time.
409 Conflict
User already registered. Deprecated by omission from later RFCs and by non-registration with the IANA.
410 Gone
The user existed once, but is not available here any more.
411 Length Required
The server will not accept the request without a valid Content-Length. Deprecated by omission from later RFCs and by non-registration with the IANA.
412 Conditional Request Failed
The given precondition has not been met.
413 Request Entity Too Large
Request body too large.
414 Request-URI Too Long
The server is refusing to service the request because the Request-URI is longer than the server is willing to interpret.
415 Unsupported Media Type
Request body in a format not supported.
416 Unsupported URI Scheme
Scheme of the Request-URI is unknown to the server.
417 Unknown Resource-Priority
There was a resource-priority option tag, but no Resource-Priority header.
420 Bad Extension
Bad SIP Protocol Extension used, not understood by the server.
421 Extension Required
The server needs a specific extension not listed in the Supported header.
422 Session Interval Too Small
The received request contains a Session-Expires header field with a duration below the minimum timer.
423 Interval Too Brief
Expiration time of the resource is too short.
424 Bad Location Information
The request's location content was malformed or otherwise unsatisfactory.
425 Bad Alert Message
The server rejected a non-interactive emergency call, indicating that the request was malformed enough that no reasonable emergency response to the alert can be determined.
428 Use Identity Header
The server policy requires an Identity header, and one has not been provided.
429 Provide Referrer Identity
The server did not receive a valid Referred-By token on the request.
430 Flow Failed
A specific flow to a user agent has failed, although other flows may succeed. This response is intended for use between proxy devices, and should not be seen by an endpoint (and if it is seen by one, should be treated as a 400 Bad Request response).
433 Anonymity Disallowed
The request has been rejected because it was anonymous.
436 Bad Identity-Info
The request has an Identity-Info header, and the URI scheme in that header cannot be dereferenced.
437 Unsupported Certificate
The server was unable to validate a certificate for the domain that signed the request.
438 Invalid Identity Header
The server obtained a valid certificate that the request claimed was used to sign the request, but was unable to verify that signature.
439 First Hop Lacks Outbound Support
The first outbound proxy the user is attempting to register through does not support the "outbound" feature of RFC 5626, although the registrar does.
440 Max-Breadth Exceeded
If a SIP proxy determines a response context has insufficient Incoming Max-Breadth to carry out a desired parallel fork, and the proxy is unwilling/unable to compensate by forking serially or sending a redirect, that proxy MUST return a 440 response. A client receiving a 440 response can infer that its request did not reach all possible destinations.
469 Bad Info Package
If a SIP UA receives an INFO request associated with an Info Package that the UA has not indicated willingness to receive, the UA MUST send a 469 response, which contains a Recv-Info header field with Info Packages for which the UA is willing to receive INFO requests.
470 Consent Needed
The source of the request did not have the permission of the recipient to make such a request.
480 Temporarily Unavailable
Callee currently unavailable.
481 Call/Transaction Does Not Exist
Server received a request that does not match any dialog or transaction.
482 Loop Detected
Server has detected a loop.
483 Too Many Hops
Max-Forwards header has reached the value '0'.
484 Address Incomplete
Request-URI incomplete.
485 Ambiguous
Request-URI is ambiguous.
486 Busy Here
Callee is busy.
487 Request Terminated
Request has terminated by bye or cancel.
488 Not Acceptable Here
Some aspect of the session description or the Request-URI is not acceptable.
489 Bad Event
The server did not understand an event package specified in an Event header field.
491 Request Pending
Server has some pending request from the same dialog.
493 Undecipherable
Request contains an encrypted MIME body, which recipient can not decrypt.
494 Security Agreement Required
The server has received a request that requires a negotiated security mechanism, and the response contains a list of suitable security mechanisms for the requester to choose between, or a digest authentication challenge.

== 5xx—Server Failure Responses ==
500 Internal Server Error
The server could not fulfill the request due to some unexpected condition.
501 Not Implemented
The server does not have the ability to fulfill the request, such as because it does not recognize the request method. (Compare with 405 Method Not Allowed, where the server recognizes the method but does not allow or support it.)
502 Bad Gateway
The server is acting as a gateway or proxy, and received an invalid response from a downstream server while attempting to fulfill the request.
503 Service Unavailable
The server is undergoing maintenance or is temporarily overloaded and so cannot process the request. A "Retry-After" header field may specify when the client may reattempt its request.
504 Server Time-out
The server attempted to access another server in attempting to process the request, and did not receive a prompt response.
505 Version Not Supported
The SIP protocol version in the request is not supported by the server.
513 Message Too Large
The request message length is longer than the server can process.
555 Push Notification Service Not Supported
The server does not support the push notification service identified in a 'pn-provider' SIP URI parameter
580 Precondition Failure
The server is unable or unwilling to meet some constraints specified in the offer.

== 6xx—Global Failure Responses ==
600 Busy Everywhere
All possible destinations are busy. Unlike the 486 response, this response indicates the destination knows there are no alternative destinations (such as a voicemail server) able to accept the call.

603 Decline
The destination does not wish to participate in the call, or cannot do so, and additionally the destination knows there are no alternative destinations (such as a voicemail server) willing to accept the call. The response may indicate a better time to call in the Retry-After header field.

603 Network Blocked
The destination or an intermediary blocked the call due to analytics-based call processing. The Reason header field indicates which entity blocked the call and provides contact information which can be used to find out why the call was blocked. The format for the value of the Reason header is specified in ATIS-1000099.

604 Does Not Exist Anywhere
The server has authoritative information that the requested user does not exist anywhere.

606 Not Acceptable
The user's agent was contacted successfully but some aspects of the session description such as the requested media, bandwidth, or addressing style were not acceptable.

607 Unwanted
The called party did not want this call from the calling party. Future attempts from the calling party are likely to be similarly rejected.

608 Rejected
An intermediary machine or process rejected the call attempt. This contrasts with the 607 (Unwanted) SIP response code in which a human, the called party, rejected the call. The intermediary rejecting the call should include a Call-Info header with "purpose" value "jwscard", with the jCard with contact details. The calling party can use this jCard if they want to dispute the rejection.
