= Generic Authentication Architecture =

Generic Authentication Architecture (GAA) is a standard made by 3GPP defined in TR 33.919. Taken from the document:

"This Technical Report aims to give an overview of the different mechanisms that mobile applications can rely upon for authentication between server and client (i.e. the UE). Additionally it provides guidelines related to the use of GAA and to the choice of authentication mechanism in a given situation and for a given application".

Related standards are Generic Bootstrapping Architecture (GBA) and Support for Subscriber Certificates (SSC).
