= Service capability interaction manager =

In computer networks, a service capability interaction manager (or SCIM) orchestrates service delivery among application server platforms within the IP multimedia subsystem (IMS) architecture.

A key requirement for the Service Broker functionality is to be able to bridge between the existing legacy networks, and the next-generation networks. For example, if the operator has a service platform that provides freephone (or reverse charging)-type services to its GSM subscriber, the service broker will enable the operator to extend this to the IMS environment without modifying the service platform or the service application. The service broker will also enable the Centrex-type services to be combined with existing GSM services, such as ringback tones or VPN.
