= Peer-to-peer video sharing =

Basic service of IP Multimedia Subsystem

Peer-to-peer video sharing is a basic service on top of the IP Multimedia Subsystem (IMS). Early proprietary implementations might also run a simple SIP infrastructure, too.

The GSM Association calls it "Video Share". The peer-to-peer video sharing functionality is defined by the Phase 1 of the GSMA Video Share service. For a more detailed description of the full GSMA Video Share service, please see the Wikipedia entry for Video Share.

The most basic form is typically connected to a classical circuit-switched (CS) telephone call. While talking on the CS line the speaker can start in parallel a multimedia IMS session. The session is normally a video stream, with audio being optional (since there is an audio session already open on the CS domain). It is also possible to share photos or files.

Actually, P2P video sharing does not require a full IMS implementation. It could work with a pure IETF Session Initiation Protocol (SIP) infrastructure and simple HTTP Digest authentication. However, mobile operators may want to use it without username/password provisioning and the related frauds problems. One possible solution is the Early IMS Authentication method. In the future USIM/ISIM based authentication could be introduced, too. So the IMS adds up extra security and management features that are normally required by a mobile operator by default.

== Early implementation by Nokia ==
The early Nokia implementation requires the manual setting of an attribute in the phone book. When the video session is triggered (by simply pulling down the back-side camera cover on a 6680), the video sharing client looks up the destination URI based on the MSISDN number of the B party of the current open CS voice call. The video sharing is possible only if this number has a valid entry in the phone book and a valid URI for the SIP call.

However, this method is not really scalable, since the user has to enter very complex strings into the phone book manually. Because this service does not involve any application server, it is difficult to make a good business model for it. Usually, the first commercial services were based on the idea that video sharing will increase the length of the voice sessions, and the resulting increased revenue would be enough to cover the costs of the video sharing service.

== History ==
The P2P video sharing was introduced in 2004 by Nokia. Two major operators started commercial implementations: "Turbo Call" from Telecom Italia Mobile (TIM) in Italy and Telecomunicações Móveis Nacionais, SA (TMN) in Portugal.

The first handsets to support P2P video sharing were the Nokia 6630 and 6680. The 6680 is especially suited for turning on the video sharing by having a slider on top of the back-side camera. Later the Nokia N70 was added to the commercially supported handsets.

== Popularity ==
TIM Italy reported about 10% penetration (based on the potentially available customers with appropriate handsets).

== Supported handsets ==
- Nokia 6630, 6680
- Nokia N70
- Nokia 5230
