= European Telecommunications Standards Institute =

European technology standards organization

- Type: Public
- Industry: Standardization organization
- Founded: 1988; 38 years ago
- Headquarters: Sophia-Antipolis, France
- Subsidiaries: Telecoms & Internet converged Services & Protocols for Advanced Networks
- Website: www.etsi.org

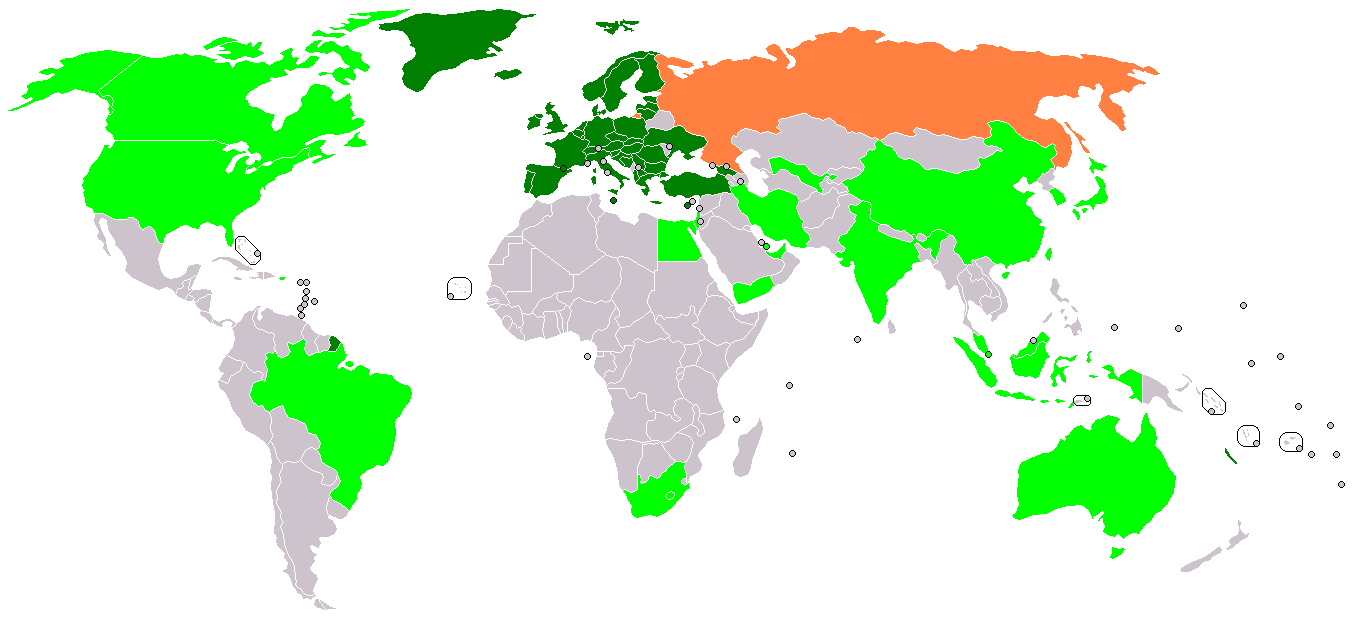
Full members Associate members Observers

The European Telecommunications Standards Institute (ETSI) is an independent, not-for-profit, standardization organization operating in the field of information and communications. ETSI supports the development and testing of global technical standards for ICT-enabled systems, applications and services.

== Overview and history ==
ETSI was set up in 1988 by the European Conference of Postal and Telecommunications Administrations (CEPT) following a proposal from the European Commission (EC). ETSI is the officially recognized body with a responsibility for the standardization of information and communication technologies (ICT). It is one of the three bodies officially recognized by the European Union as a European Standards Organisation (ESO), the others being CEN and CENELEC. The role of the ESOs is to support EU regulation and policies through the production of harmonised European Standards (ENs) and other deliverables. The standards developed by ESOs are the only ones that can be recognized as ENs.

ETSI develops standards in key global technologies such as: GSM, TETRA, 3G, 4G, 5G, DECT.

ETSI's standardization activities are organized around sectors: Home & Office, Better Living with ICT, Content Delivery, Networks, Wireless Systems, Transportation, Connecting Things, Interoperability, Public Safety and Security. Technical activities are carried out in the different ETSI technical groups (Technical Committee (TC), ETSI Project (EP), ETSI Partnership Project (EPP), Industry Specification Group (ISG), and Special Committee (SC). ETSI's Cloud Group aims to consider standardisation within cloud computing and conformity with interoperability standards in this field.

In October 2023, ETSI reported a data breach.Hackers stole a database containing information on ETSI's online users.

== Membership ==
ETSI has more than 900 member organizations worldwide from 65 countries and five continents. Its community is diverse and includes all the key stakeholders of the ICT sector: private companies, research entities, academia, government and public bodies as well as societal stakeholders. Small and Medium Enterprises (SMEs) and Micro-Enterprises (MEs) represent more than a quarter of ETSI's total membership. The list of current members can be found on the ETSI website.

Membership contributions are calculated depending on the type of membership. Members' and associate members' contributions are calculated by class which is derived from the member company's annual ECRT band.

== Location ==
The organisation is located in Sophia-Antipolis, in the south of France.

== See also ==
- EN 301 549
- Radio Equipment Directive
- List of EN standards
