= Subscriber location function =

The subscriber location function, or SLF is a function within an IP multimedia subsystem that provides information about the home subscriber server (HSS) that is associated with a particular user profile. It is generally implemented using a database. If the home domain contains more than one HSS, I-CSCF and S-CSCF will communicate with SLF, and find the appropriate HSS based on user profile. CSCF communicates with the SLF using diameter Dx interface and the application server communicates with the SLF using Sh interface. SLF function currently has limited source material.
