= Telecoms & Internet converged Services & Protocols for Advanced Networks =

Standardization body of ETSI, specializing in fixed networks and Internet convergence

- Founded: 2003
- Parent: European Telecommunications Standards Institute

The Telecoms & Internet converged Services & Protocols for Advanced Networks (TISPAN) is a standardization body of ETSI, specializing in fixed networks and Internet convergence. It was formed in 2003 from the amalgamation of the ETSI bodies Telecommunications and Internet Protocol Harmonization Over Networks (TIPHON) and Services and Protocols for Advanced Networks (SPAN).

TISPAN's focus is to define the European view of the Next Generation Networking (NGN), though TISPAN also includes much participation from regions outside Europe.

TISPAN NGN Release 1 was published in December 2005 and contained the architectural foundations and basic specifications required in support of PSTN replacement. The TISPAN NGN architecture is based on sharing common components between cooperating subsystems. The TISPAN NGN architecture complies with the general reference model for next generation networks defined in ITU-T Recommendation Y.2011 [1] and is therefore layered with a service stratum and a transport stratum. Each of these layers is further decomposed into sub-systems that perform specific roles within the overall architecture. This allows new subsystems to be added over time to cover new demands and service classes. By making network resources, applications, and user equipment common to all subsystems, it ensures mobility of users, terminals and services as much as possible, even across administrative boundaries. A key subsystem is based on the architectures of 3rd Generation Partnership Project (3GPP) IP Multimedia Subsystem (IMS). TISPAN has been working with 3GPP to extend the IMS architecture with capabilities required in support of wire-line access.

TISPAN NGN Release 2 was finalized early 2008, and added support for IPTV services and Business Communications over the IMS.

Since early 2008, TISPAN has begun work on the third release of its NGN specifications with prime focus on IPTV enhancements, Content Delivery Networks (CDN) and home networking. In 2011, TISPAN published the specification of a functional architecture for Content Delivery Networks (CDN) and is now working on the specification of the protocols applicable to the reference points identified in this architecture (See ETSI TS 182 019)

The ETSI website on Next Generation Networking states: "Standards for fixed NGN were developed by the now closed ETSI technical committee TISPAN. The TC has adopted the 3GPP™ core IMS specifications using Internet (SIP) protocols to allow features such as Presence, IPTV, Messaging, and Conferencing to be delivered irrespective of the network in use. Maintenance of NGN standards are now the responsibility of TC NTECH."
