= Wang Lan =

Wang Lan (in Chinese name order, with the surname first) or Lan Wang (in Western name order) may refer to:

- Lan Wang (computer scientist) (born 1975), Chinese-American professor of computer science
- Lan Wang (materials scientist), Chinese-Australian professor of physics
- Lan Wang (softball), pitcher for China in the 2018 Women's Softball World Championship
- Lan Wang (statistician), Chinese-American professor of management science
- Wang Lan (novelist) (1922–2003), Taiwanese artist, writer, and politician

== See also ==
- Wang Lan Halt, a train station on the Burma Railway
