= Lan Wang (computer scientist) =

Chinese-American computer scientist

Lan Wang is a Chinese and American computer scientist specializing in computer networks, and especially named data networking, including data forwarding, data synchronization, and network scheduling. She is the Faudree University Professor of Computer Science at the University of Memphis, on leave as a program director at the National Science Foundation.

== Education ==
Wang was born in Hunan. She graduated from Peking University in 1997, with a bachelor's degree in computer science, and continued her education at the University of California, Los Angeles. She received a master's degree there in 1999 and completed her Ph.D. in 2004. Her dissertation, Improving Internet resilience through lightweight preventive detection (LPD) and persistent detection and recovery, was supervised by Lixia Zhang.

== Career ==
She became an assistant professor of computer science at the University of Memphis in 2004. She was promoted to associate professor in 2010 and to full professor in 2016, and chaired the department from 2016 until 2023, when she took a temporary posting as a program director at the National Science Foundation. She was named as Dunavant Professor in 2021, before becoming Faudree University Professor in 2025.

In 2022 the university gave Wang the Willard R. Sparks Eminent Faculty Award, its "highest distinction given to a faculty member by the university".
