= Hourglass model =

Computer networking model

In computer networking, the hourglass model—also called the narrow (or thin) waist—is a way of describing layered system design in which a single, widely adopted spanning layer sits at the narrow “waist” of the stack and serves as the sole common interface between many heterogeneous lower-layer technologies and many diverse higher-layer applications. In the context of the Internet, the spanning layer is commonly identified with the Internet Protocol (IP). Constraining the waist to be simple and general makes it easier for new link technologies to be deployed below and new applications to be deployed above, while preserving interoperability across the whole system.

== Origin and rationale ==
The conceptual root of the hourglass is the idea of a spanning layer, articulated by David D. Clark to mean the minimal common service that hides differences in lower layers and presents a uniform service to higher layers. Clark's broader design philosophy for the Internet stressed end-to-end connectivity, minimalism in the network, and keeping intelligence at the edges—ideas later formalized as the end-to-end principle.

In the formal treatment by Beck, the hourglass model explains why a tightly constrained waist tends to maximize deployment scalability: a simple, general spanning layer lowers coordination costs for both implementers (below) and application developers (above). Beck calls this the Deployment Scalability Trade-off, arguing that simplicity and generality at the waist outperform richer, featureful designs in terms of real-world adoption and evolvability.

== Description ==
In the Internet hourglass, the waist historically corresponds to IP, with many link/network technologies below (e.g., Ethernet, Wi‑Fi, optical links) and many transports and applications above (e.g., TCP, UDP, HTTP, SMTP). The IAB captured this design in guidance that, ideally, there should be one—and only one—protocol at the Internet layer, allowing uniform operation across heterogeneous lower layers and diverse upper-layer protocols and applications.

Researchers have also modeled why hourglass-shaped stacks emerge and why the waist tends to ossify. Akhshabi and Dovrolis proposed an evolutionary model (EvoArch) showing that, from broad initial conditions, a layered system tends to develop an hourglass shape with long-lived protocols at the waist, while innovation concentrates above and below.

== Relationship to the end-to-end principle ==
The hourglass model and the end-to-end principle are related but distinct. The end-to-end principle argues that many functions (e.g., correctness, security) must be provided by end systems to be complete and is often cited to justify simplicity in the network core. The hourglass model complements this by showing how limiting the functionality of the spanning layer (the waist) improves interoperability and scalability across the stack.

== Transparency, middleboxes, and ossification ==
Practical deployments have introduced NATs and other middleboxes, reducing Internet transparency (the original idea that packets traverse the network essentially unaltered) and complicating end-to-end connectivity. While the waist enabled rapid growth, its success also led to ossification: protocols at or near the waist (notably IPv4, TCP, and UDP) became difficult to change or replace, channeling innovation either to the edges or into overlays above the waist. IETF guidance consequently emphasized simplicity and modularity to preserve scaling properties in large networks.

== Evolution of the waist ==
Many textbooks still describe IP as the narrow waist. However, some observers argue that, in practice, HTTP (often with TLS over TCP) has become a de facto waist for much of today's traffic, because new services, content delivery, and even real‑time applications increasingly tunnel over HTTP to traverse middleboxes and firewalls. A research line has explored whether an HTTP-centered waist is more evolvable than an IP-centered waist, precisely because HTTP gives deployers flexible naming, redirection, and explicit middlebox support without changing network-layer primitives. This claim is debated, but it highlights how the hourglass model is descriptive of deployment realities as well as prescriptive about design.

== Beyond the Internet ==
The hourglass idea generalizes to other systems. Beck notes that the Unix kernel interface (basic system calls) functions as a spanning layer enabling diverse hardware below and diverse applications above, illustrating the same deployment scalability logic in a different domain.

== See also ==
- Application layer
- End-to-end principle
- Internet protocol suite
- Internet Protocol
- Middlebox
- Network address translation
- OSI Model
- Transport layer
