= Conflict (process) =

Friction, disagreement, or discord between people

A conflict is a situation in which unacceptable differences in interests, expectations, values, or opinions occur between individuals, or between or in groups.

== Definitions ==
Depending on the source, there are different definitions for conflicts:

- Disagreements, discrepancies, and frictions that occur when the actions or beliefs of one or more members of the group are unacceptable to one or more other group members and are rejected by them.
- An interaction between actors (individuals, groups, organizations, etc.), where at least one actor experiences incompatibilities in thinking/imagination/perception and/or feeling and/or wanting with the other actor (the other actors) in such a way that in realizing an impairment by another actor (the other actors) occurs.
- Contradictory interests that are represented by different people or groups of people and who are dependent on each other in achieving their interests (or at least believe this).
- Interactive processes that manifest themselves in incompatibility, disagreement, or dissonance within or between social entities.
- A state of tension that arises because there are irreconcilable contradictions between two or more parties with regard to a certain good.
- Activities that take place when conscious beings (individuals or groups) want to take actions that do not match their desires, needs, or obligations.
- Situations where hostile behavior occurs.
- Behavior that deliberately hinders the achievement of another's goals.
- State of objective incompatibility between values or goals.

== Classification ==
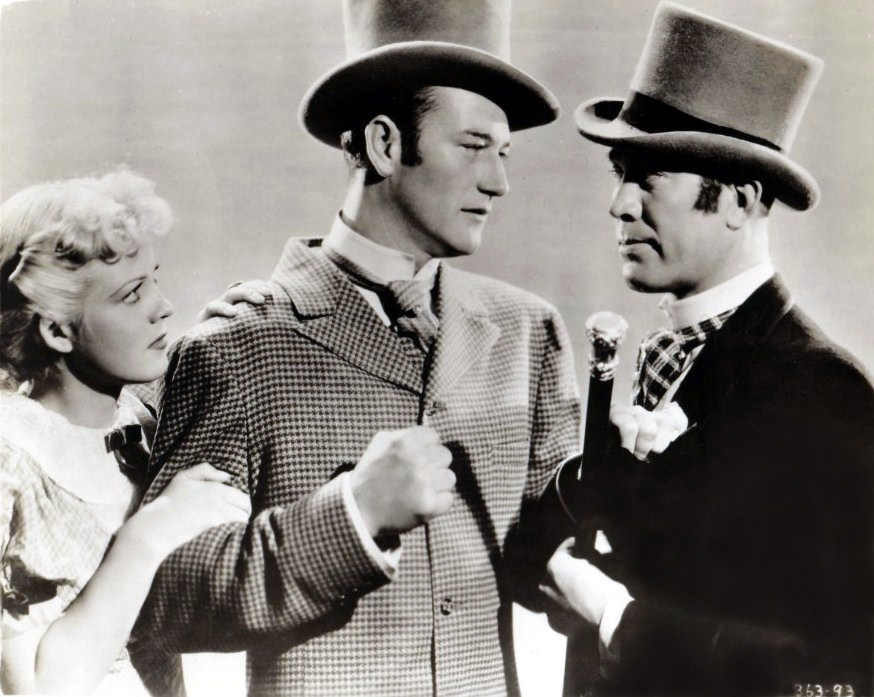
Jean Rogers, John Wayne, and Ward Bond in the film Conflict (1936)

In cases of intragroup conflict, there is a conflict between the overall goals of the general group, and the goals of at least one person in that group. The disagreements may also be examples of interpersonal conflict, a conflict between two or more people. Intrapersonal conflicts are conflicts occurring in an individual, for example a bad conscience or an identity conflict. Intergroup conflict is conflict between two or more groups.

=== Types ===
More specific types of conflict include the following.

- Content conflict occurs when individuals disagree about how to deal with a certain issue. This can be a good thing as it has the potential to stimulate discussion and increase motivation.
- Relationship conflict occurs when individuals disagree about one another. This relational conflicts decreases performance, loyalty, satisfaction and commitment, and causes individuals to be irritable, negative and suspicious. This stems from interpersonal incompatibilities. It is an awareness of frictions caused by frustrations, annoyance, and irritations. Relationship conflict is comparable to affective and cognitive conflict as defined by Amason and Pinkley, respectively.
- Process conflict refers to disagreement over the group's approach to the task, its methods, and its group process. They note that although relationship conflict and process conflict are harmful, task conflict is found to be beneficial since it encourages diversity of opinions, although care should be taken so it does not develop into a process or relationship conflict.
- Task conflict is related to disagreements in viewpoints and opinion about a particular task in group settings. It is associated with two interrelated and beneficial effects. The first is group decision quality. Task conflict encourages greater cognitive understanding of the issue being discussed. This leads to better decision making for the groups that use task conflict. The second is affective acceptance of group decisions. Task conflict can lead to increased satisfaction with the group decision and a desire to stay in the group.
- Affective conflict is an emotional conflict developed from interpersonal incompatibilities and disputes. It often produces suspicion, distrust, and hostility. Therefore, it is seen as a negative kind of conflict and an obstacle to those who experience it and is described as "dysfunctional."
- Cognitive conflict occurs during tasks and comes from a difference in perspective and judgement. It improves decision making and allows for the freer exchange of information between group members. Cognitive conflict is seen as a positive tension that promotes good group work.

=== Geography ===
Conflicts can also be categorized geographically, as in the North-South conflict and the East-West conflict. Other examples are territorial conflicts such as the Kosovo War, the Iraq-Iran War, the Middle East conflict, the China-Taiwan conflict and the Korean Conflict.

=== Persons or Groups ===
Likewise, conflicts can be categorised according to the people involved. Areas in which conflicts frequently occur are, for example, in the family, between parents, between siblings or between parents and children, among friends and acquaintances, in groups, in school, in nature, in business between companies, employers or employees, in science, between generations (generational conflict), between ethnic groups (ethnic conflict) or within or between states (see peace research).

The following are examples of conflict that could be either intragroup or intergroup conflict.

- Conflict of interest is involvement in multiple interests which could possibly corrupt the motivation or decision-making.
- Cultural conflict is a type of conflict that occurs when different cultural values and beliefs clash.
  - Intellectual conflict is a subclass of cultural conflict.
- Ethnic conflict is conflict between two or more contending ethnic groups.
- Organizational conflict is discord caused by opposition of needs, values, and interests between people working together.
- Role conflict involves incompatible demands placed upon a person in a manner that makes accomplishing both troublesome.
- Social conflict is the struggle for supremacy or autonomy between social classes.
- Work–family conflict involves incompatible demands between the work and family roles of an individual.

== Development ==
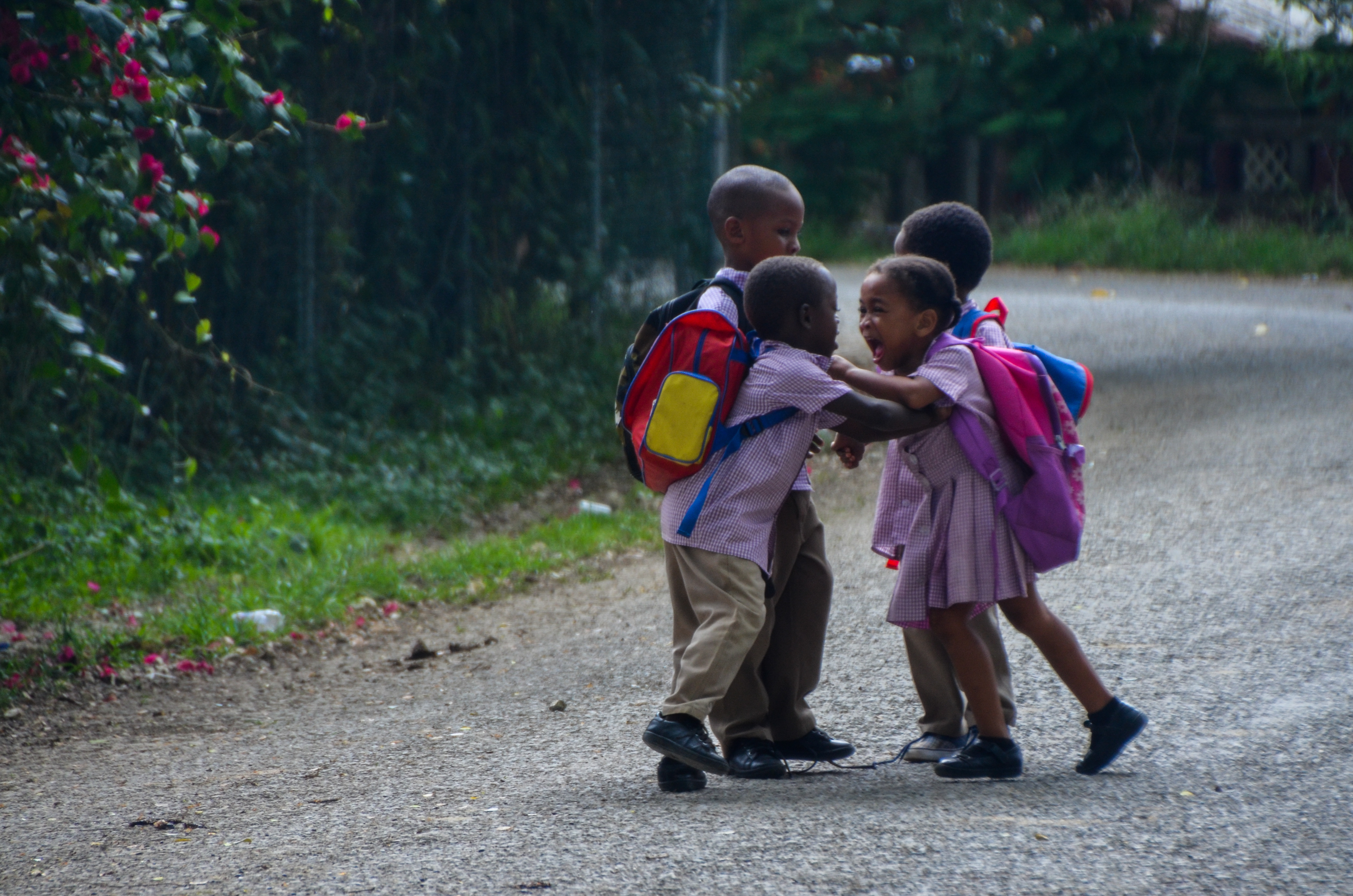
School children fighting in Jamaica

Conflicts are not static events in themselves, but develop a dynamic that can become uncontrollable in extreme cases. The course of a conflict can be divided into four phases:

Phase of conflict	Name	Description
Phase I	Latent phase	The conflict situation emerges
Phase II	Conscience	Both parties recognise the conflict
Phase III	Action	Both parties react based on their thoughts and emotions
Phase IV	Interactions	Both parties interact with alternating conflict modes

=== Escalation ===
Beyond that a conflict can further escalate. Models of escalation in conflicts are the Friedrich Glasl's model of conflict escalation, the conflict curve by Michael S. Lund and the hourglass model by Oliver Ramsbotham. When an escalation is initiated by one party there often is a sequence of escalation behaviour: requests, demands, angry remarks, threats, harassment and abuse.

Models with a fixed order of stages of conflict escalation have been criticized for not representing the probabilistic nature of conflicts.

== Behavior ==
Hierarchy of arguments according to their escalation potential by Graham

The various ways in which people react to conflict situations have been presented by Gerhard Schwarz, sometimes in reference to Eric Lippmann, as follows:

- Flight (Evasion, Avoidance)
- Fight (Enforcement, Destruction)
- Subordination (Adaptation, Concession, Unilateral Acceptance)
- Delegation (of the problem to another instance)
- Compromise (Agreement with advantages and disadvantages on both sides)
- Consensus (Cooperation)

These behavior patterns can lead to the solution or dissolution of a conflict in different situations. While the first-mentioned stages are anti- or confrontational in character, the last-mentioned stages represent forms of constructive conflict resolution - with consensus as the highest (to be learned) form. Paul Graham divided forms of argument hierarchically according to their escalation potential and the quality of the argument. In the dual concern model, conflict types are divided along the two dimensions: orientation towards one's own goal or orientation towards the goal of the conflict partner. Personality tests for conflict behavior are the Kraybill Conflict Style Inventory, the open-source licensed "Ethics Position Questionnaire" and the Thomas-Kilmann Conflict Mode Instrument. Further, more general and comprehensive personality tests are Leadership Derailers, Social value orientation, Hexaco-PI-R and NEO-PI-R, which also include a bit of conflict behaviour.

=== Interpersonal ===
Often, further phenomena occur in the course of a conflict. Doubts and uncertainties about one's own position are usually replaced with firm convictions (confirmation bias), without anything having changed in the real probabilities. Moreover, people often stick to their conviction in order not to lose face, even if the conviction is now being questioned by themselves. The reciprocity ("an eye for an eye") favors a conflict escalation and a convergence of behavior when the other side consistently shows competitive or consistently collaborative behavior to achieve their goals. However, collaborative behavior tips more easily into competitive behavior than vice versa. In conflicts, destructive behaviours can also appear: violence, coercion, intimidation, blackmailing, deception and seduction.

Negative emotions such as anger and fear make it difficult to work through the differences. Moreover, anger is often contagious, because a person who is met with anger reacts in turn more often angrily. Likewise, behaviors such as hostile, overly aggressive, choleric, conflict-avoiding, evasive, passive-aggressive, nagging or accusing (without changing anything), non-changing, annoying, pessimistic, superior or indecisive behavior can make conflict resolution difficult.

The attribution of presumed strengths, attitudes, and values to the other conflict party is often distorted during a conflict. Likewise, there is often a false attribution of whether the problem arises from the situation or the character of the participants. As a conflict escalates, the tactics used by each side become more confrontational (harder). However, there are situations where the threatened party fares better when a threat is not met with a counter-threat. A too dominant negotiation style can provoke a blocking stance as a reaction. In conflicts between equally strong parties, a competitive conflict style is avoided if a strong counter-reaction is expected. While at the beginning of a conflict escalation a counter-reaction tends to be disproportionately high, it is rather disproportionately low at a higher level of escalation. Often at the beginning of a conflict escalation, various coalitions are formed to support one's own interests, which later in the conflict lead to conflicts between two groups.

=== Intergroup ===
When a conflict occurs not just between two individuals (interpersonal conflict), but between two or more groups (intergroup conflict), additional effects of group dynamics come into play. Five typical emotions have been identified in groups that contribute to escalation: superiority, injustice, vulnerability, mistrust, and helplessness. Additionally, envy, contempt, pity and admiration can also occur between groups. Envy results when the out-group is perceived to have high competence, but low warmth. Envious groups are usually jealous of another group's symbolic and tangible achievements and view that group as competition. Contempt results when the out-group is taken to be low in both competence and warmth. According to Forsyth, contempt is one of the most frequent intergroup emotions. In this situation, the out-group is held responsible for its own failures. In-group members also believe that their conflict with the out-group can never be resolved. Out-groups that are believed by the in-group to be high in warmth but low in competence are pitied. Usually pitied groups are lower in status than the in-group and are not believed to be responsible for their failures. Admiration occurs when an out-group is taken to be high in both warmth and competence, however, admiration is very rare because these two conditions are seldom met. An admired out-group is thought to be completely deserving of its accomplishments. Admiration is thought to be most likely to arise when a member of the in-group can take pride in the accomplishments of the out-group, and when the out-group achieving does not interfere with the in-group.

Groups often exhibit more competitive behavior than individuals within a group do with each other. Merely perceiving one's own group identity already favors discrimination against foreign groups. When individuals with a collaborative conflict style join a group, a switch to a competitive group conflict style (group behavior) can occur. Additionally, other effects of dominant behavior within the group and between groups come into play. Motivations such as greed, fear, and social identity increase in groups. If the potential reward for greed is reduced, the effect of greed diminishes. There is a double standard that manifests itself primarily in an enhancement of the actions of one's own group, but also in a devaluation of the actions of other groups. This also includes distorted generalizations and stereotypes attributed to the other group. It involves both deindividuation (opponents are only perceived as part of a homogeneous group, not as individuals), and dehumanization (opponents are perceived as subhuman). In an experiment, more than half of the participants opted for a choice with less reward if the process was perceived as fair in return.

A key player in inter-group relations and conflict is the collective sentiment a person's own group (in-group) feels toward another group (out-group). These inter-group emotions are usually negative, and range in intensity from feelings of discomfort when interacting with a member of a certain other group to full on hatred for another group and its members. For example, in Fischer's organizational research at the University of Oxford, inter-group conflict was so 'heated' that it became mutually destructive and intractable, resulting in organizational collapse.

Out-group-directed emotions can be expressed both verbally and non-verbally, and according to the stereotype content model, are dictated by two dimensions: the perceived warmth (friendliness) and competence of the other group (skillfulness). Depending on the perceived degree of warmth and competence, the stereotype content model predicts four basic emotions that could be directed toward the out-group (Forsyth, 2010).

== Factors ==
Although the involved parties may hope to reach a solution to their dispute quickly, psychological and interpersonal factors can frustrate their attempts to control the conflict, and in this case, conflict escalation occurs. Conflict escalation "can be understood as an intensification of a conflict with regard to the observed extent and the means used". A number of factors including increased commitment to one's position, use of harder influence tactics, and formation of coalitions propel the escalation of the conflict.

=== Uncertainty and commitment ===
As conflicts escalate, group members' doubts and uncertainties are replaced with a firm commitment to their position. People rationalize their choices once they have made them: they seek out information that supports their views, reject information that disconfirms their views, and become more entrenched in their original position (also see confirmatory bias). Additionally, people believe that once they commit to a position publicly, they should stick with it. Sometimes, they may realize the shortcomings of their views, but they continue defending those views and arguing against their opponents just to save face. Finally, if the opponents argue too strongly, reactance may set in and group members become even more committed to the position.

=== Perception and misperception ===
Individuals' reactions to the conflict are shaped by their perception of the situation and people in the situation. During the conflict, opponents' inferences about each other's strengths, attitudes, values, and personal qualities tend to be largely distorted.

=== Misattribution ===
During the conflict, people explain their opponents' actions in ways that make the problem worse. Fundamental attribution error occurs when one assumes that opponents' behavior was caused by personal (dispositional) rather than situational (environmental) factors. When conflict continues for a while, opponents might decide that this conflict is intractable. People usually expect intractable conflicts to be prolonged, intense, and very hard to resolve.

=== Misperceiving motivations ===
During the conflict, opponents often become mistrustful of one another wondering if their cooperative motivations were replaced by competitive ones. This loss of trust makes it difficult to return to the cooperative relationship. People with competitive social value orientations (SVOs) are the most inaccurate in their perception of opponents' motivation. They often think that others compete with them when in fact, there is no competition going on. Competitors are also more biased in their search for information that confirms their suspicions that others compete with them. They also tend to deliberately misrepresent their intentions, sometimes claiming to be more cooperatively oriented than they actually are.

=== Soft tactics and hard tactics ===
People use soft tactics at the outset of the conflict, but as it escalates, tactics become stronger and harder. To demonstrate this phenomenon, Mikolic, Parker, and Pruitt (1997) simulated a conflict situation by creating a "birthday card factory" with study participants who were paid a small amount for each card they manufactured using paper, colored markers, and ribbons. The work went well until researchers' confederate who posed as another participant started hoarding production materials. Initially, group members tried to solve the problem with statements and requests. When these methods failed they shifted to demands and complaints, and then to threats, abuse, and anger.

Although hard tactics can overwhelm the opponent, they often intensify conflicts. Morton Deutsch and Robert Krauss (1960) used trucking game experiment to demonstrate that capacity to threaten others intensifies conflict. They also showed that establishing a communication link does not always help to solve the dispute. If one party threatens the other, the threatened party will sometimes fare best if it cannot respond with a counterthreat. Equally powerful opponents, however, learn to avoid the use of power if the fear of retaliation is high.

=== Reciprocity and upward conflict spiral ===
In many cases, upward conflict spirals are sustained by the norms of reciprocity: if one group or person criticizes the other, the criticized person or group feels justified in doing the same. In conflict situations, opponents often follow the norm of rough reciprocity, i.e. they give too much (overmatching) or too little (undermatching) in return. At low levels of conflict, opponents overmatch their threats, while at high levels of conflict they undermatch their threats. Overmatching may serve as a strong warning, while undermatching may be used to send conciliatory messages.

=== Few and many ===
When conflicts erupt, group members use coalitions to shift the balance of power in their favor, and it is typical for multiparty conflicts to reduce to two-party blocks over time. Coalitions contribute to the conflict because they draw more members of the group into the affray. Individuals in coalitions work not only to ensure their own outcomes but also to worsen outcomes of non-coalition members. Those who are excluded from the coalition react with hostility and try to regain power by forming their own coalition. Thus, coalitions need to be constantly maintained through strategic bargaining and negotiation.

=== Irritation and anger ===
It is generally difficult for most people to remain calm and collected in a conflict situation. However, an increase in negative emotions (i.e. anger) only exacerbates the initial conflict. Even when group members want to discuss their positions calmly and dispassionately, once they become committed to their positions, an emotional expression often replaces logical discussion. Anger is also contagious: when group member negotiates with someone who is angry, they become angry themselves.

== Styles ==
Thomas and Kilmann distinguish five typical conflict styles:

Conflict style	Pros and Cons	Situations
Competitive (win-lose)	Pursuit of own objectives; Use of power; Can lead to disputes; Can cause resentments	Emergencies requiring quick decisions; Important and unpopular decisions; When you are certain you are right (important matters); To defend against others taking advantage
Collaborative (win-win)	Cooperation to everyone's satisfaction; Detailed analysis of interests; Involves cognitive conflict; Can be time-consuming	When a compromise is not acceptable; To gain support for the cause; To maintain or improve relationships; To unify perspectives
Compromise-seeking (½win-½win)	Middle ground regarding assertiveness and cooperativity; Splitting the difference; Neither half nor whole?	Temporary solutions for complex conflicts; When goals of two equally strong opponents are mutually exclusive; Under time pressure; Evasive strategy for collaborative or competitive
Avoiding (lose-lose)	Neglect of both interests; Conflicts remain unresolved; Delaying tactic	Hopeless situations outside of one's control; Unimportant situations; To let others cool down; When others can resolve the conflict more effectively
Accommodating (lose-win)	Opposite of competitive; Self-sacrifice; Selfless generosity; Doormat	When the other person's issues are much more important; To build social capital; When clearly inferior and losing; When harmony is especially important; To allow subordinates to develop

Limited resources can be distributed either according to the previous investment of time, energy and resources, according to equal shares, according to power ratios or according to need. A decision can be reached using various procedures. Ideally, a consensus is worked on collaboratively (and preferably on a win-win solution) because this serves the interests of all parties involved. In situations where the interests are immovable and mutually exclusive, other procedures must be used. Common procedures in which only some of the interests of both sides are served are compromise procedures or distribution imposed by a neutral authority (as in the inquisitorial or arbitration procedure, with parents or a supervisor). Furthermore, a vote or a judicial judgment is often carried out as a competitive procedure, in which the interests of the larger group or the right-preserving side are served first. Likewise, a concession by one side can resolve the conflict if there is a willingness to do so. As a concession implies at least a partial renunciation of one's own interests with little to no compensation, a willingness to do so becomes less likely with increasing escalation.

According to Ramsbotham, conflicts are divided into five phases of conflict development, to which three conflict resolution strategies are assigned:

- Phase of differences: conflict transformation
- Phase of objection: conflict transformation
- Phase of polarization: settlement of conflicts
- Phase of violence: settlement of conflicts
- Phase of war: containment of conflicts

While the Thomas and Kilmann system describes five typical conflict styles, aligns the measures with the conflict styles and the situations and emphasizes collaboration as a solution, the measures in the Glasl system and the Ramsbotham system are aligned with the escalation level.

== Resolution ==
Conflict resolution is conceptualized as the methods and processes involved in facilitating the peaceful ending of conflict and retribution.

Committed group members attempt to resolve group conflicts by actively communicating information about their conflicting motives or ideologies to the rest of group (e.g., intentions; reasons for holding certain beliefs) and by engaging in collective negotiation. Dimensions of resolution typically parallel the dimensions of conflict in the way the conflict is processed.

== Mediation ==
Conflict is a social process that is exacerbated when individual members of a group take sides in the debate. Among the methods to resolve conflict is mediation of the dispute by a group member not currently involved in the dispute. More specifically, a mediator is defined as a person who attempts to resolve a conflict between two group members by intervening in this conflict. Put simply, the mediator can be thought of as a disinterested guide directs the disputants through the process of developing a solution to a disagreement. For conflicts with negative interpersonal relationships on a low escalation level, relationship building can help transform the nature of the relationship and improve the communication. As mediation depends on meeting together peacefully, it is more successful in conflicts with low levels of escalation where there is still a will to work on an agreement.

Although the tendency will be for group members who are uninvolved in the dispute to remain uninvolved, in some cases, the sheer intensity of the conflict may escalate to the point where mediation is unavoidable and still feasible. Third party mediation of the conflict opens avenues for communication between group members in conflict. It allows members to express their opinions and request clarification of other member's standpoints while the mediator acts as a form of protection against any shame or "loss of face" that either disputant may experience. This can be done by shedding a positive light on the reconciliation that was made during the mediation process. For instance, if it was negotiated that two cashiers will rotate the weekends they work, the mediator might point out that now each worker gets a weekend off every two weeks. The mediator can also offer assistance in refining solutions and making counter-offers between members, adjusting the time and location of meetings so that they are mutually satisfying for both parties. There are three major mediation approaches:

1. Inquisitorial procedure: Using this procedure, the mediator asks each of the disputants a series of questions, considers the two sets of responses, and then selects and imposes a mandatory solution on the members. The inquisitorial procedure is the least popular approach to mediation.
2. Arbitration: Here, mediation involves the two disputants explaining their arguments to the mediator, who creates a solution based on the arguments presented. Arbitration is best for low intensity conflict, but is the most favored mediation style overall.
3. Moot: The moot approach involves an open discussion between disputants and the mediator about the problems and potential solutions. In the moot approach, the mediator cannot impose a mandatory solution. After arbitration, a moot is the most preferred mediation style. It does not always lead to a tangible result.

In practice, conflict resolution is often interwoven with daily activities, as in organizations, workplaces and institutions. Staff and residents in a youth care setting, for instance, interweave everyday concerns (meals, lessons, breaks, meetings, or other mundane but concerted projects) with interpersonal disputes.

== Institutionalization ==
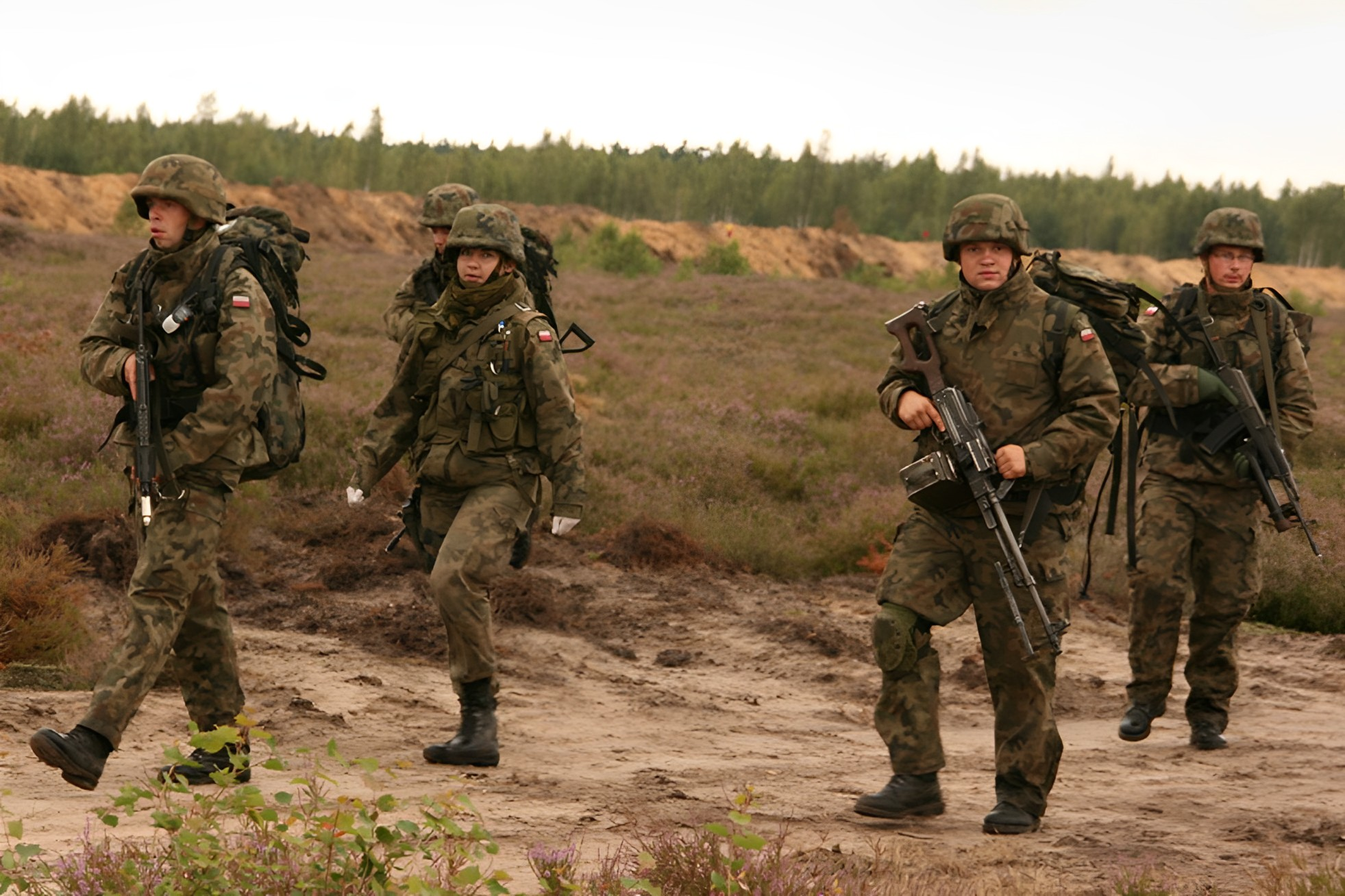
Military forces, such as the Polish Armed Forces seen here, are an example of an institution that handles conflict.

The institutionalization of conflicts refers to the resolution or settlement of a conflict when it has been passed on to an institution. However, delegation to institutions brings about a lack of freedom in terms of the distribution structure of entitlements and offers. The parties to the conflict are directed by persons not involved in the conflict. In this process, the emotional and factual components of the conflict are separated. The institution or instance proceeds with rules that are mutually recognized by the parties to the conflict.

=== Feud ===
Conflicts can be strongly or weakly institutionalized. The feud, a weakly institutionalized conflict, has some rules that are recognized by the parties to the conflict (e.g., existence of a legitimate feud reason, formal announcement, procedure, etc.), all signs of institutionalization, but on the other hand, the conflict is handled by the parties to the conflict themselves (no social differentiation); the emotional and factual component of the conflict are not separated: friends of the respective parties to the conflict not only have the right, but even the duty to assist, and they generate further conflicts.

=== Justice system ===
The justice system is a national competitive system (interest of one party is to be served) for the regulation of conflicts. The procedures are divided into criminal procedures and civil procedures. The procedures are used when a legal claim is to be negotiated.

=== Military ===
The military is used, among other things, in the event of a very strong escalation of a conflict between states or paramilitary groups. It is a competitive system with comparatively strong damages and collateral damages and is therefore used as a last resort. Early written works on military conflict resolution are The Art of War by Sunzi and On War by Carl von Clausewitz.

=== Divorce ===
A divorce is a judicial conflict management system. If there are children, sometimes mediation, counseling or child protective services are used following a separation of parents.

=== Company conflicts ===
Conflicts between employees of a company can create conflict cost to the company. There is On-the-job training and Coaching for conflict management.

== See also ==
- Eristic
