= Lixia Zhang =

Professor of computer science

- 张丽霞
- Born: China
- Education: California State University, Los Angeles; Massachusetts Institute of Technology
- Known for: Resource Reservation Protocol; Middlebox
- Scientific career
- Fields: Computer networks
- Workplaces: University of California, Los Angeles
- Doctoral advisor: David D. Clark
- Doctoral students: Lan Wang

Lixia Zhang (Chinese: 张丽霞) is the Jonathan B. Postel Professor of Computer Science at the University of California, Los Angeles. Her expertise is in computer networks; she helped found the Internet Engineering Task Force, designed the Resource Reservation Protocol, coined the term "middlebox", and pioneered the development of named data networking.

== Biography ==
Zhang grew up in northern China, where she worked as a tractor driver on a farm when the Cultural Revolution closed the schools. She earned a master's degree in electrical engineering in 1981 at California State University, Los Angeles, and completed her doctorate at the Massachusetts Institute of Technology in 1989, under the supervision of David D. Clark. After working as a researcher at Xerox PARC, she moved to UCLA in 1996.

She and her husband, Jim Ma, have two sons. They reside in Sherman Oaks.

== Contributions ==
Zhang was one of the 21 participants in the initial meeting of the Internet Engineering Task Force, in 1986, the only woman and the only student at the meeting. In the IETF, her initial work concerned routing, although her thesis research was instead on quality of service. She was also a member of the Internet Architecture Board, from 1994 to 1996 and again from 2005 to 2009. During the 20th anniversary for the initial IETF meeting in 2006, Zhang was interviewed by the IETF Journal, published on May 7, 2006.

A protocol she designed for changing the settings in an experimental network setup became the basis for the Resource Reservation Protocol. Zhang's paper on the protocol, "RSVP: A New Resource ReSerVation Protocol" (with Steve Deering, Deborah Estrin, Scott Shenker, and Daniel Zappala, IEEE Network 1993) was selected in 2002 as one of ten landmark articles reprinted with commentary in the 50th-anniversary issue of IEEE Communications Magazine.

In 1999 Zhang coined the term "middlebox" to refer to a computer networking device that performs functions other than that of a regular Internet Protocol router. Examples of middleboxes include firewalls and network address translators. Her term has been widely adopted by the industry.

Beginning in 2010 she has been the leader of a multi-campus research project concerning named data networking.

== Awards and honors ==
In 2006, Zhang became a Fellow of both the Association for Computing Machinery and the Institute of Electrical and Electronics Engineers for contributions to the architecture and signaling protocols in packet switched networks.

In 2009, she won the IEEE Internet Award.

In 2012, she was named to the Postel Professorship.

In 2014, Zhang is featured in the Notable Women in Computing cards. Her picture appeared on the four of diamonds in a pack of playing cards featuring 54 notable women in technology.

In 2020, she won the 2020 SIGCOMM Lifetime Achievement Award, while in 2021 she was inducted to the Internet Hall of Fame.

In 2025, she was elected to the National Academy of Engineering.
