= Michael Akritas =

Greek-American statistician

- Occupations: Statistician, researcher, professor
- Awards: ASA Fellow; IMS Fellow

Academic background
- Education: University of Athens; University of Southampton; University of Wisconsin
- Doctoral advisor: Richard A. Johnson

Academic work
- Discipline: Statistics
- Institutions: MIT; University of Rochester; NTUA; Pennsylvania State University
- Doctoral students: Lan Wang

Michael G. Akritas (born 1950) is a Greek American statistician and professor emeritus of Statistics at the Pennsylvania State University.

His research has focused on nonparametric statistics, factorial designs, censored data, high-dimensional data modeling, astrostatistics, and social statistics.

Akritas was elected Fellow of the American Statistical Association in 2001, and Fellow of the Institute of Mathematical Statistics in 2001.

== Education ==
Akritas received a B.Sc. in mathematics from the University of Athens in 1972, an M.Sc. in Operations Research from the University of Southampton, studied at the University of Patras under George G. Roussas, and in 1978 he received a Ph.D. in statistics from the University of Wisconsin–Madison under Richard A. Johnson.

== Career ==
Akritas taught at MIT from 1978 to 1979, and again from 1980 to 1981 after serving in the Greek military. He then moved to the University of Rochester, and in 1985 he joined the Department of Statistics at The Pennsylvania State. He held a position at National Technical University of Athens, and visiting positions at Texas A&M University, University of Pennsylvania, Australian National University, University of Goettingen, and University of Cyprus. He co-founded, and served as Director of, the Statistical Consulting Center for Astronomy; he also co-founded, and served as Treasurer of, the International Society for Nonparametric Statistics. He has published 104 articles which have been cited over 4700 times.

== Selected publications ==
- Akritas, M.G. (1986). Bootstrapping the Kaplan-Meier Estimator. J. Amer. Statist. Assoc. 81, 1032–1038.
- Akritas, M.G. (1988). Pearson-Type Goodness-of-Fit Tests: The Univariate Case. J. Amer. Statist. Assoc. 83, 222–230.
- Akritas, M.G. (1990). The Rank Transform Method in Some Two-Factor Designs. J. Amer. Statist. Assoc. 85, 73–78.
- Akritas, M.G. (1994). Nearest Neighbor Estimation of a Bivariate Distribution Under Random Censoring. Ann. Statist. 22, 1299–1327.
- Akritas, M.G., Arnold, S.F. (1994). Fully Nonparametric Hypotheses for Factorial Designs I: Multivariate Repeated Measures Designs. J. Amer. Statist. Assoc. 89, 336–343.
- Akritas, M.G., Siebert, J. (1996). A test for partial correlation with censored astronomical data. Monthly Notices of the Royal Astronomical Society 278, 919–924.
- Akritas, M.G., Bershady, M.A. (1996). Linear regression for astronomical data with measurement errors and intrinsic scatter. The Astrophysical Journal 470, 706–714.
- Van Keilegom, I., and Akritas, M.G. (1999). Transfer of tail information in censored regression models. Annals of Statistics 27, 1745–1784.
- Akritas, M.G. and Van Keilogom, I. (2001). Nonparametric estimation of the residual distribution. Scandinavian Journal of Statistics 28, 549–567.
- Akritas, M. and Papadatos, N. (2004). Heteroscedastic One-Way ANOVA and Lack-of-Fit Tests. J. Amer. Statist. Assoc. 99, 368–382.
- Gaugler, T. and Akritas, M.G. (2012). Mixed Effects Models: The Symmetry Assumption and Missing Data. J. Amer. Statist. Assoc., 107, 1230–1238.
- Akritas, M.G. (2016). Projection Pursuit Multi-Index (PPMI) Models. Statistics and Probability Letters 114, 99–103.
- Akritas, M.G. (2016). Asymptotic Theory for the First Projective Direction. Annals of Statistics 44, 2161–2189.
