= Interactive Connectivity Establishment =

Technique in computer networking

Interactive Connectivity Establishment (ICE) is a technique used in computer networking to find ways for two computers to talk to each other as directly as possible in peer-to-peer networking. This is most commonly used for interactive media such as Voice over Internet Protocol (VoIP), peer-to-peer communications, video, and instant messaging. In such applications, communicating through a central server would be slow and expensive, but direct communication between client applications on the Internet is very tricky due to network address translators (NATs), firewalls, and other network barriers.

ICE is developed by the Internet Engineering Task Force MMUSIC working group and is published as RFC 8445, as of August 2018, and has obsolesced both RFC 5245 and RFC 4091.

== Overview ==
Network address translation (NAT) became an effective technique in delaying the exhaustion of the available address pool of Internet Protocol version 4, which is inherently limited to around four billion unique addresses. NAT gateways track outbound requests from a private network and maintain the state of each established connection to later direct responses from the peer on the public network to the peer in the private network, which would otherwise not be directly addressable.

VoIP, peer-to-peer, and many other applications require address information of communicating peers within the data streams of the connection, rather than only in the Internet Protocol packet headers. For example, the Session Initiation Protocol (SIP) communicates the IP address of network clients for registration with a location service, so that telephone calls may be routed to registered clients. ICE provides a framework with which a communicating peer may discover and communicate its public IP address so that it can be reached by other peers.

Session Traversal Utilities for NAT (STUN) is a standardized protocol for such address discovery including NAT classification. Traversal Using Relays around NAT (TURN) places a third-party server to relay messages between two clients when direct media traffic between peers is not allowed by a firewall.

== IETF specifications ==
- RFC 8489: Session Traversal Utilities for NAT (STUN).
- RFC 8656: Traversal Using Relays around NAT (TURN): Relay Extensions to STUN.
- RFC 6544: TCP Candidates with Interactive Connectivity Establishment (ICE)
- RFC 8445: Interactive Connectivity Establishment (ICE): A Protocol for Network Address Translator (NAT) Traversal

== See also ==
- Realm-Specific IP (RSIP)
- Middlebox (Middlebox Communications or MIDCOM)
- Universal Plug and Play (UPnP)
- NAT Port Mapping Protocol (NAT-PMP)
- Port Control Protocol (PCP)
- WebRTC
- Traversal Using Relays around NAT (TURN)
- Session Traversal Utilities for NAT (STUN)
