= Van Jacobson =

American computer scientist

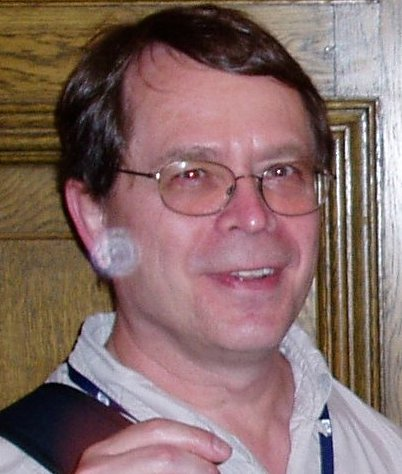
- Known for: Work on TCP/IP
- Awards: IEEE Koji Kobayashi Computers and Communications Award
- Scientific career
- Fields: Computer science

Van Jacobson is an American computer scientist, renowned for his work on TCP/IP network performance and scaling. He is one of the primary contributors to the TCP/IP protocol stack—the technological foundation of today’s Internet. Since 2013, Jacobson is an adjunct professor at the University of California, Los Angeles (UCLA) working on Named Data Networking.

== Early life and education ==
Jacobson studied Modern Poetry, Physics, and Mathematics and received an M.S. in physics and a B.S. in mathematics from the University of Arizona. He did graduate work at Lawrence Berkeley Laboratory.

== Career ==
His work redesigning TCP/IP's congestion control algorithms (Jacobson's algorithm) to better handle congestion is said to have saved the Internet from collapsing in the late 1980s and early 1990s. He is also known for the TCP/IP Header Compression protocol described in RFC 1144: Compressing TCP/IP Headers for Low-Speed Serial Links, popularly known as Van Jacobson TCP/IP Header Compression.

He is the co-author of several widely used network diagnostic tools, including traceroute, tcpdump, and pathchar. He was a leader in the development of the multicast backbone (MBone) and the multimedia tools vic, vat, and wb.

Jacobson worked at the Lawrence Berkeley Laboratory from 1974 to 1998 as a Research scientist in the Real-time Controls Group and later group leader for the Network Research Group. He was Chief Scientist at Cisco Systems from 1998 to 2000. In 2000 he became Chief Scientist for Packet Design, Inc. and in 2002 for a spin-off, Precision I/O. He joined PARC as a research fellow in August 2006.

In January 2006 at Linux.conf.au, Jacobson presented another idea about network performance improvement, which has since been referred to as network channels. Jacobson discussed his ideas on Named data networking (NDN), the focus of his work at PARC, in August 2006 as part of the Google Tech Talks. Jacobson is now working with the NDN Consortium funded by the National Science Foundation to explore and create the future of the internet.

== Awards and memberships ==
Jacobson together with his colleague at LBL, Steven McCanne, won R&D Magazine's 1995 R&D 100 Award for development of a software toolpack that enables multiparty audio and visual conferencing via the MBone (Multicast Backbone).

For his work, Jacobson received the 2001 ACM SIGCOMM Award for Lifetime Achievement "for contributions to protocol architecture and congestion control", the 2002 IEEE Koji Kobayashi Computers and Communications Award, and was elected to the National Academy of Engineering in 2004 for his "contributions to network protocols, including multicasting and the control of congestion."

In 2012, Jacobson was inducted into the Internet Hall of Fame by the Internet Society.

== See also ==
- Content centric networking
