= Lan Wang (materials scientist) =

Chinese/Australian materials scientist

- Education: Zhejiang University; National University of Singapore; University of Minnesota
- Awards: Asian Scientist 100
- Scientific career
- Fields: Materials Science
- Workplaces: RMIT University

Professor Lan Wang is a Chinese-Australian materials scientist known for expertise in materials synthesis and advanced materials characterisation.

He was appointed as an associate professor of physics at RMIT University in Melbourne, Australia in 2014.

== Career ==
Wang has a Bachelor of Science in Physics (1993) and Master of Science in theoretical physics (1997) from Zhejiang University, China, a PhD in Physics from the National University of Singapore, Singapore (2001) and a PhD in Materials Sciences from the University of Minnesota, USA (2006).

He has held professional positions at XinDa Communication Solution Inc, China; Rush Presbyterian St Luke's Medical Center, Chicago, USA; University of Minnesota, USA; and Nanyang Technological University, Singapore.

From 2014 he has been Associate Professor, School of Applied Science, RMIT University.

Wang is a Theme Leader and node leader at ARC Centre of Excellence in Future Low-Energy Electronics Technologies (FLEET) where he leads the Centre's nano-device fabrication research theme, as well as studying high-temperature quantum anomalous Hall systems in topological materials.

Past and current collaborations include the National University of Singapore (NUS), Hong Kong University (HKU), University of Southampton, and the China High Magnetic Field Lab at Chinese Academy of Sciences.

== Expertise ==
Wang's research has focused on topological condensed matter systems, spintronics, and magnetic materials. His team at RMIT grows single crystals, thin films and nanostructures, fabricating devices for electron and spin transport measurements for new generation spintronic devices.

- Low-temperature and high-magnetic field electron and spin transport
- topological insulators
- magnetic materials
- spintronic and magneto-electronic devices
- device fabrication
- growth of single crystals
- thin films and nano-structures.

For material growth and characterization, Wang is experienced with ultra high vacuum (UHV) systems and thin-film deposition, single-crystal growth, and nanostructure growth. For device fabrication he is experienced in E-beam and photo lithography. For characterising electric and magnetic properties of materials, he is experienced in standard magnetic measurements, measurements and analysis of the quantum oscillations of single crystalline systems in high magnetic field and low temperature, point-contact spectroscopy, gate-tuned electric transport in nano-devices, and measurements of magneto-electrical coupling effect.

== Publications ==
Wang has published over 100 papers with total citations over 2500, and an H-index of 26

=== Selected publications ===
- Hard magnetic properties in nanoflake van der Waals Fe_{3}GeTe_{2} (2018, selected in Nature Communication's monthly condensed-matter highlights)
- Electrically tunable in-plane anisotropic magnetoresistance in topological insulator BiSbTeSe_{2} Nanodevices (2015)
- Large exchange bias after zero-field cooling from an unmagnetized state (2011)
- Ferromagnetism in dilute magnetic semiconductors through defect engineering: Li-doped ZnO (2010)
- Strongly correlated properties and enhanced thermoelectric response in Ca_{3}Co_{4}-xMxO9(M = Fe, Mn, and Cu) (2010)
- Ferromagnetism in ZnO nanowires derived from electro-deposition on AAO template and subsequent oxidation (2008)

== Qualifications and international journal roles ==
- Editorial board member of Scientific Reports
- Reviewer for Reviewer for Nature Communications, Advanced Materials, Nano Letters, Applied Physics Letters, Journal of Applied Physics, IEEE Transactions on Magnetics, AIP advances, Scientific Reports, Physical Review B
- 2006 PhD in Materials Sciences from University of Minnesota, USA
- 2001 PhD in Physics from National University of Singapore, Singapore
- 1997 Msc in theoretical physics from ZheJiang University, China
- 1993 Bachelor of Science in Physics from ZheJiang University, China (Zhu Ke Zhen scholarship, the highest honour of ZheJiang University)
