= David D. Clark =

American computer scientist

David Dana Clark
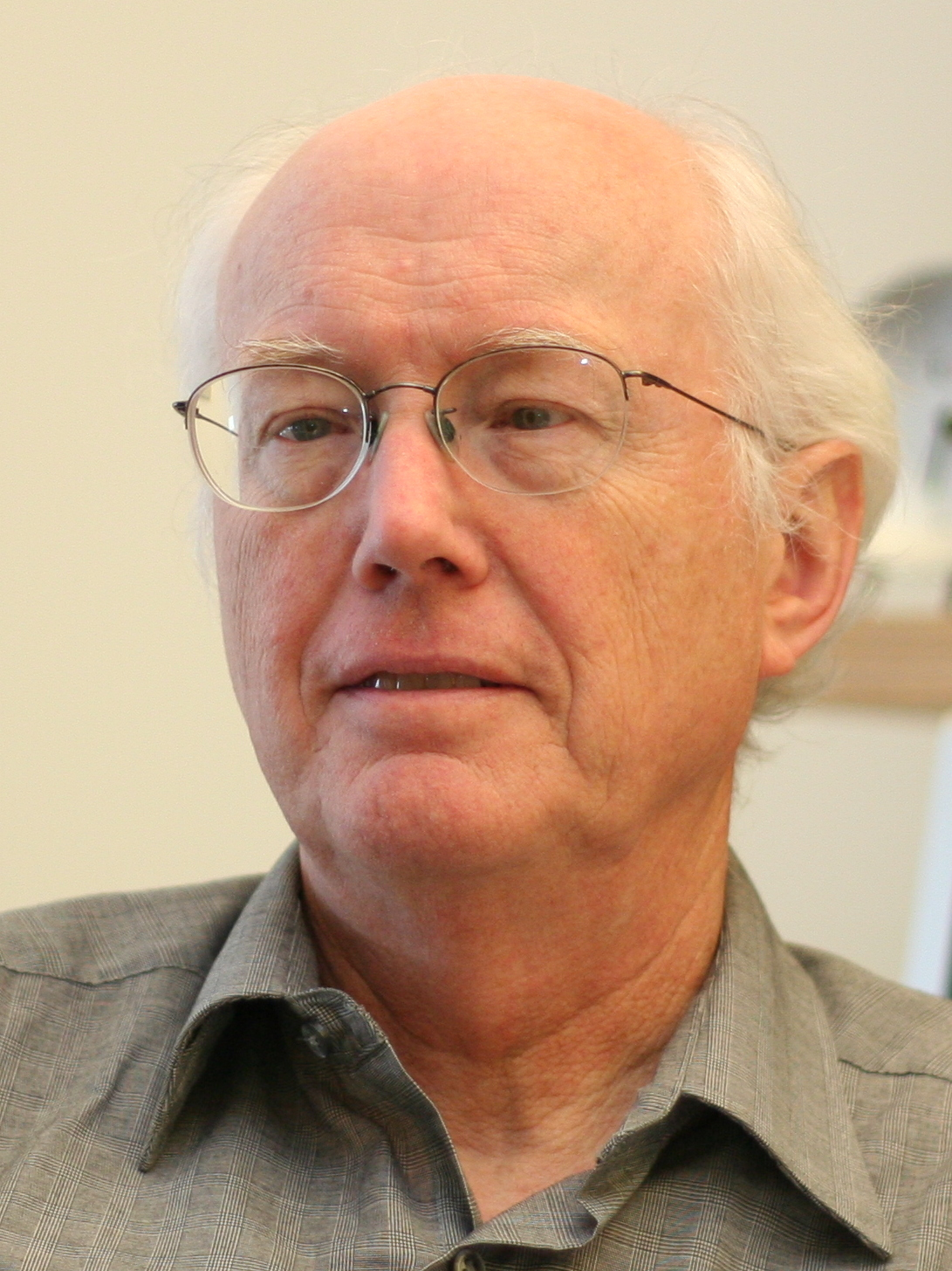
- Clark in 2009
- Born: April 7, 1944 (age 82)
- Education: Swarthmore College (BA); Massachusetts Institute of Technology (MS, ME, PhD)
- Known for: Clark-Wilson model, Multics
- Awards: SIGCOMM Award (1990); National Computer Systems Security Award (1997); Telluride Tech Festival Award of Technology (2001); IEEE Richard W. Hamming Medal (1998); Jonathan B. Postel Service Award (2025); IEEE Internet Award (2026)
- Scientific career
- Fields: Computer Science
- Workplaces: Internet Architecture Board; National Research Council; MIT; Humboldt University of Berlin
- Thesis: An input/output architecture for virtual memory computer systems (1973)
- Doctoral advisor: Jerry Saltzer
- Doctoral students: Steve Bauer; Simson Garfinkel; Dina Katabi; Radia Perlman; Lixia Zhang

David Dana Clark (born April 7, 1944) is an American computer scientist and Internet pioneer who has been involved with Internet developments since the mid-1970s. He currently works as a senior research scientist at MIT's Computer Science and Artificial Intelligence Laboratory (CSAIL).

== Education ==
Clark graduated from Swarthmore College in 1966. In 1968, he received his master's and engineer's degrees in electrical engineering from MIT, where he worked on the I/O architecture of Multics under Jerry Saltzer. He received his Ph.D. in electrical engineering from MIT in 1973.

== Career ==
From 1981 to 1989, Clark acted as chief protocol architect in the development of the Internet, and chaired the Internet Activities Board, which later became the Internet Architecture Board. He has also served as chairman of the Computer Sciences and Telecommunications Board of the National Research Council.

In 1990 he was awarded the SIGCOMM Award in recognition of his major contributions to Internet protocol and architecture. Clark received in 1998 the IEEE Richard W. Hamming Medal.

In 1996, Clark was elected a member of the National Academy of Engineering for the design and development of efficient implementation techniques for Internet protocols. In 1997 he received the National Institute of Standards and Technology and National Security Agency's National Computer Systems Security Award in that year. In 1998, he was elevated to Fellow of the IEEE for leadership in the engineering and deployment of the protocols that embody the Internet. In 2001, he was inducted as a Fellow of the Association for Computing Machinery.

Also in 2001, he was awarded the Telluride Tech Festival Award of Technology in Telluride, Colorado, and in 2011 the Internet & Society Lifetime Achievement Award from the Oxford Internet Institute at the Oxford University. In 2013, he was inducted into the Internet Hall of Fame.

His recent research interests include what the architecture of the Internet will look like in the post-PC era as well as "extensions to the Internet to support real-time traffic, explicit allocation of service, pricing and related economic issues, and policy issues surrounding local loop employment".

Clark was awarded the 2025 Jonathan B. Postel Service Award of the Internet Society. He received the 2026 IEEE Internet Award for "groundbreaking contributions and steadfast advocacy in promoting an integrated perspective on the Internet's technical, policy, legal, and economic development".

== Legacy ==
Clark has been credited with a popular statement in the computer science realm:

We reject: kings, presidents, and voting. We believe in: rough consensus and running code.

— David D. Clark (1992)

In 1999, law professor Lawrence Lessig stated that "rough consensus and running code" had broad significance as "a manifesto that will define our generation.' Clark's new ethos of consensus has become a widely used methodology software development today and replaced a more top down approach that existed in the 80s.

== Selected publications ==
- David D. Clark, "An Input/Output Architecture for Virtual Memory Computer Systems", Ph.D. dissertation, Project MAC Technical Report 117, January 1974
- Saltzer, J. H.; Reed, D. P.; Clark, D. D. (April 8–10, 1981). End-to-End Arguments in System Design. Second International Conference on Distributed Computing Systems. Paris: IEEE Computer Society. pp. 509–512.
- David D. Clark, "The Design Philosophy of the DARPA Internet Protocols", Computer Communications Review 18:4, August 1988, pp. 106–114
- Clark, David D.; Shenker, Scott; Zhang, Lixia (October 1992). "Supporting real-time applications in an Integrated Services Packet Network: architecture and mechanism". ACM SIGCOMM Computer Communication Review. 22 (4). Association for Computing Machinery: 14–26. doi:10.1145/144191.144199.
- R. Braden, David D. Clark, S. Shenker, and J. Wroclawski, "Developing a Next-Generation Internet Architecture", ISI white paper, 2000
- L. W. McKnight, W. Lehr, David D. Clark (eds.), Internet Telephony, MIT Press, 2001, ISBN 0-262-13385-7
- David D. Clark, K. Sollins, J. Wroclawski, R. Braden, "Tussle in Cyberspace: Defining Tomorrow’s Internet", Proceedings of SIGCOMM 2002, ACM Press, 2002
- David D. Clark, K. Sollins, J. Wroclawski, and T. Faber, "Addressing Reality: An Architectural Response to Real-World Demands on the Evolving Internet", ACM SIGCOMM 2003 Workshops, Karlsruhe, August 2003
