= Lan Wang (statistician) =

American statistician

Lan Wang is a Chinese and American statistician whose research focuses on high-dimensional statistics, quantile regression, and the application of statistics to personalized medicine and the statistical study of health care costs. She is a professor and department chair of management science in the University of Miami Patti and Allan Herbert Business School, where she holds a Centennial Endowed Chair.

== Education and career ==
Wang has a 1998 bachelor's degree from Tsinghua University. She completed her Ph.D. in 2003 at the Pennsylvania State University. Her doctoral dissertation, Testing in heteroscedastic ANOVA with large number of levels and in nonparametric ANCOVA, was supervised by Michael Akritas.

She became a professor of statistics at the University of Minnesota before moving to her present position at the University of Miami. She was co-editor-in-chief for the journal Annals of Statistics for the 2022–2024 term.

== Recognition ==
Wang was elected as a Fellow of the Institute of Mathematical Statistics in 2017, and as a Fellow of the American Statistical Association in 2018. In 2021, she was named as an Elected Member of the International Statistical Institute.
