= Information-centric networking =

Information-centric networking (ICN) is an approach to evolve the Internet infrastructure away from a host-centric paradigm, based on perpetual connectivity and the end-to-end principle, to a network architecture in which the focal point is identified information (or content or data). Some of the application areas of ICN are in web applications, multimedia streaming, the Internet of Things, Wireless Sensor Networks and Vehicular networks and emerging applications such as social networks, Industrial IoTs.

In this paradigm, connectivity may well be intermittent, end-host and in-network storage can be capitalized upon transparently, as bits in the network and on data storage devices have exactly the same value, mobility and multi access are the norm and anycast, multicast, and broadcast are natively supported. Data becomes independent from location, application, storage, and means of transportation, enabling in-network caching and replication. The expected benefits are improved efficiency, better scalability with respect to information/bandwidth demand and better robustness in challenging communication scenarios. In information-centric networking the cache is a network level solution, and it has rapidly changing cache states, higher request arrival rates and smaller cache sizes. In particular, information-centric networking caching policies should be fast and lightweight.

== IRTF Working Group ==
The Internet Research Task Force (IRTF) is sponsoring a research group on Information-Centric Networking Research, which serves as a forum for the exchange and analysis of ICN research ideas and proposals. Current and future work items and outputs are managed on the ICNRG wiki.
