= Information-centric networking caching policies =

In computing, cache algorithms (also frequently called cache replacement algorithms or cache replacement policies) are optimizing instructions‍—‌or algorithms‍—‌that a computer program or a hardware-maintained structure can follow in order to manage a cache of information stored on the computer. When the cache is full, the algorithm must choose which items to discard to make room for the new ones. Due to the inherent caching capability of nodes in Information-centric networking ICN, the ICN can be viewed as a loosely connect network of caches, which has unique requirements of Caching policies. Unlike proxy servers, in Information-centric networking the cache is a network level solution. Therefore, it has rapidly changing cache states and higher request arrival rates; moreover, smaller cache sizes further impose different kind of requirements on the content eviction policies. In particular, eviction policies for Information-centric networking should be fast and lightweight. Various cache replication and eviction schemes for different Information-centric networking architectures and applications are proposed.

== Policies ==
=== Time aware least recently used (TLRU) ===
The Time aware Least Recently Used (TLRU) is a variant of LRU designed for the situation where the stored contents in cache have a valid life time. The algorithm is suitable in network cache applications, such as information-centric networking (ICN), content delivery networks (CDNs) and distributed networks in general. TLRU introduces a new term: TTU (Time to Use). TTU is a time stamp of a content/page which stipulates the usability time for the content based on the locality of the content and the content publisher announcement. Owing to this locality based time stamp, TTU provides more control to the local administrator to regulate in network storage. In the TLRU algorithm, when a piece of content arrives, a cache node calculates the local TTU value based on the TTU value assigned by the content publisher. The local TTU value is calculated by using a locally defined function. Once the local TTU value is calculated the replacement of content is performed on a subset of the total content stored in cache node. The TLRU ensures that less popular and small life content should be replaced with the incoming content.

=== Least frequent recently used (LFRU) ===
The Least Frequent Recently Used (LFRU) cache replacement scheme combines the benefits of LFU and LRU schemes. LFRU is suitable for 'in network' cache applications, such as ICN, CDNs and distributed networks in general. In LFRU, the cache is divided into two partitions called privileged and unprivileged partitions. The privileged partition can be defined as a protected partition. If content is highly popular, it is pushed into the privileged partition. Replacement of the privileged partition is done as follows: LFRU evicts content from the unprivileged partition, pushes content from privileged partition to unprivileged partition, and finally inserts new content into the privileged partition. In the above procedure the LRU is used for the privileged partition and an approximated LFU (ALFU) scheme is used for the unprivileged partition, hence the abbreviation LFRU. The basic idea is to filter out the locally popular contents with ALFU scheme and push the popular contents to one of the privileged partition.
