= Caller ID spoofing =

Phone caller faking the phone number sent to the recipient of a phone call

Example of caller ID spoofed via orange boxing; both the name and number are faked to reference leetspeak

Caller ID spoofing is a spoofing attack which causes the telephone network's Caller ID to indicate to the receiver of a call that the originator of the call is a station other than the true originating station. This can lead to a display showing a phone number different from that of the telephone from which the call was placed.

The term is commonly used to describe situations in which the motivation is considered malicious by the originator.

One effect of the widespread availability of Caller ID spoofing is that, as AARP published in 2019, "you can no longer trust call ID."

== History ==
Caller ID spoofing has been available for years to people with a specialized digital connection to the telephone company, called an ISDN PRI circuit. Collection agencies, law-enforcement officials, and private investigators have used the practice, with varying degrees of legality. The first mainstream caller ID spoofing service was launched U.S.-wide on September 1, 2004 by California-based Star38.com. Founded by Jason Jepson, it was the first service to allow spoofed calls to be placed from a web interface. It stopped offering service in 2005, as a handful of similar sites were launched.

Caller ID spoofing also has been used in purchase scams on web sites such as Craigslist and eBay. The scamming caller claims to be calling from Canada into the U.S. with a legitimate interest in purchasing advertised items. Often the sellers are asked for personal information such as a copy of a registration title, etc., before the (scammer) purchaser invests the time and effort to come and see the items for sale. In the 2010 election, fake caller IDs of ambulance companies and hospitals were used in Missouri to get potential voters to answer the phone. In 2009, a vindictive Brooklyn wife spoofed the doctor's office of her husband's lover in an attempt to trick the other woman into taking medication which would make her miscarry.

Caller ID spoofing has been used for prank calls, sometimes with devastating consequences. In December 2007, a teenager in Washington used a caller ID spoofing service to send a SWAT team to an unsuspecting victim's house. In February 2008, a man from Collegeville, Pennsylvania was arrested for making threatening phone calls to women and having their home numbers appear "on their caller ID to make it look like the call was coming from inside the house."

In March 2008, several residents in Wilmington, Delaware, reported receiving telemarketing calls during the early morning hours, when the caller had apparently spoofed the caller ID to evoke Tommy Tutone's 1981 hit "867-5309/Jenny". By 2014, an increase in illegal telemarketers displaying the victim's own number, either verbatim or with a few digits randomized, was observed as an attempt to evade caller ID-based blacklists.

In the Canadian federal election of May 2, 2011, both live calls and robocalls are alleged to have been placed with false caller ID, either to replace the caller's identity with that of a fictitious person (Pierre Poutine of Joliette, Quebec) or to disguise calls from an Ohio call centre as Peterborough, Ontario, domestic calls. See Robocall scandal.

In June 2012, a search on Google returned nearly 50,000 consumer complaints by individuals receiving multiple continuing spoofed voice over IP (VoIP) calls on lines leased / originating from "Pacific Telecom Communications Group" located in Los Angeles, CA (in a mailbox store), in apparent violation of FCC rules. Companies such as these lease out thousands of phone numbers to anonymous voice-mail providers who, in combination with dubious companies like "Phone Broadcast Club" (who do the actual spoofing), allow phone spam to become an increasingly widespread and pervasive problem. In 2013, the misleading caller name "Teachers Phone" was reported on a large quantity of robocalls advertising credit card services as a ruse to trick students' families into answering the unwanted calls in the mistaken belief they were from local schools.

On January 7, 2013, the Internet Crime Complaint Center issued a scam alert for various telephony denial-of-service attacks by which fraudsters were using spoofed caller ID to impersonate police in an attempt to collect bogus payday loans, then placing repeated harassing calls to police with the victim's number displayed. While impersonation of police is common, other scams involved impersonating utility companies to threaten businesses or householders with disconnection as a means to extort money, impersonating immigration officials or impersonating medical insurers to obtain personal data for use in theft of identity. Bogus caller ID has also been used in grandparent scams, which target the elderly by impersonating family members and requesting wire transfer of money.

In 2018, one method of caller ID spoofing was called "neighbor spoofing", using either the same area code and telephone prefix of the person being called, or the name of a person or business in the area.

== Technology and methods ==
Caller ID is spoofed through a variety of methods and different technology. The most popular ways of spoofing caller ID are through the use of VoIP or PRI lines.

=== Voice over IP ===
In the past, caller ID spoofing required an advanced knowledge of telephony equipment that could be quite expensive. However, with open source software (such as Asterisk or FreeSWITCH, and almost any VoIP company), one can spoof calls with minimal costs and effort.

Some VoIP providers allow the user to configure their displayed number as part of the configuration page on the provider's web interface. No additional software is required. If the caller name is sent with the call (instead of being generated from the number by a database lookup at destination) it may be configured as part of the settings on a client-owned analog telephone adapter or SIP phone. The level of flexibility is provider-dependent. A provider which allows users to bring their own device and unbundles service so that direct inward dial numbers may be purchased separately from outbound calling minutes will be more flexible. A carrier which doesn't follow established hardware standards (such as Skype) or locks subscribers out of configuration settings on hardware which the subscriber owns outright (such as Vonage) is more restrictive. Providers which market "wholesale VoIP" are typically intended to allow any displayed number to be sent, as resellers will want their end user's numbers to appear.

In rare cases, a destination number served by voice-over-IP is reachable directly at a known SIP address (which may be published through ENUM telephone number mapping, a .tel DNS record or located using an intermediary such as SIP Broker). Some Google Voice users are directly reachable by SIP, as are all iNum Initiative numbers in country codes +883 5100 and +888. As a federated VoIP scheme providing a direct Internet connection which does not pass through a signaling gateway to the public switched telephone network, it shares the advantages (nearly free unlimited access worldwide) and disadvantages (Internet applications).

=== Service providers ===
Some spoofing services work similarly to a prepaid calling card. Customers pay in advance for a personal identification number (PIN). Customers dial the number given to them by the company, their PIN, the destination number and the number they wish to appear as the caller ID. The call is bridged or transferred and arrives with the spoofed number chosen by the caller—thus tricking the called party.

Many providers also provide a Web-based interface or a mobile application where a user creates an account, logs in and supplies a source number, destination number, and the bogus caller ID information to be displayed. The server then places a call to each of the two endpoint numbers and bridges the calls together.

Some providers offer the ability to record calls, change the voice and send text messages.

=== Orange box ===
Another method of spoofing is that of emulating the FSK signal. This method, informally called orange boxing, uses software that generates the audio signal which is then coupled to the telephone line during the call. The object is to deceive the called party into thinking that there is an incoming call waiting call from the spoofed number, when in fact there is no new incoming call. This technique often also involves an accomplice who may provide a secondary voice to complete the illusion of a call-waiting call. Because the orange box cannot truly spoof an incoming caller ID prior to answering and relies to a certain extent on the guile of the caller, it is considered as much a social engineering technique as a technical hack.

== Caller name display ==
Telephone exchange equipment manufacturers vary in their handling of caller name display. Much of the equipment manufactured for Bell System companies in the United States sends only the caller's number to the distant exchange; that switch must then use a database lookup to find the name to display with the calling number. Canadian landline exchanges often run Nortel equipment which sends the name along with the number. Mobile, CLEC, Internet or independent exchanges also vary in their handling of caller name, depending on the switching equipment manufacturer. Calls between numbers in differing country codes represent a further complication, as caller ID often displays the local portion of the calling number without indicating a country of origin or in a format that can be mistaken for a domestic or invalid number.

This results in multiple possible outcomes:

- The name provided by the caller (in the analog telephone adapter configuration screen for voice-over-IP users or on the web interface on a spoofing provider) is blindly passed verbatim to the called party and may be spoofed at will
- The name is generated from a telephone company database using the spoofed caller ID number.
- A destination provider may display no name or just the geographic location of the provided telephone area code on caller ID (e.g., "ARIZONA", "CALIFORNIA", "OREGON", or "ONTARIO"). This often occurs where the destination carrier is a low-cost service (such as a VoIP provider) running no database or outdated data in which the number is not found.
- If the displayed number is in the recipient's address book, some handsets will display the name from the local address book in place of the transmitted name. Some VoIP providers use Asterisk (PBX) to provide similar functionality at the server; this may lead to multiple substitutions with priority going to the destination user's own handset as the last link in the CNAM chain.

== Legal considerations ==
=== Canada ===
Caller ID spoofing remains legal in Canada, and has recently become so prevalent that the Canadian Anti-Fraud Centre has "add[ed] an automated message about [the practice] to their fraud-reporting hotline". The CRTC estimates that 40% of the complaints they receive regarding unsolicited calls involve spoofing. The agency advises Canadians to file complaints regarding such calls, provides a list of protection options for dealing with them on its website, and, from July through December 2015, held a public consultation to identify "technical solutions" to address the issue.

On January 25, 2018, the CRTC set a target date of March 31, 2019 for the implementation of a CID authentication system. On December 9, 2019, the CRTC extended this date, announcing that they expect STIR/SHAKEN, a CID authentication system, to be implemented by September 30, 2020. On September 15, 2020, the CRTC extended the target date one more time, changing it to June 30, 2021. The CRTC is formally considering making its target date for STIR/SHAKEN mandatory. From November 30, 2021, telecommunications service providers in Canada were required to use STIR/SHAKEN to certify caller ID information on IP-based voice calls.

On December 19, 2018, the CRTC announced that beginning in a year from that date, phone providers must block all calls with caller IDs that do not conform to established numbering plans.

=== India ===
According to a report from the India Department of Telecommunications, the government of India has taken the following steps against the CLI spoofing service providers:

- Websites offering caller ID spoofing services are blocked in India as an immediate measure.
- International long-distance operators (ILDOs), national long-distance operators (NLDOs) and access service providers have been alerted to the existence of such spoofing services, and shall collectively be prepared to take action to investigate cases of caller ID spoofing as they are reported.

As per DOT, using spoofed call service is illegal as per the Indian Telegraph Act, Sec 25(c). Using such service may lead to a fine, three years' imprisonment or both.

=== United Kingdom ===
In the UK, the spoofed number is called the "presentation number". This must be either allocated to the caller, or if allocated to a third party, it is only to be used with the third party's explicit permission.

Since 2016, direct marketing companies have been obliged to display their phone numbers. Any offending companies can be fined up to £2 million by Ofcom.

In 2021, Huw Saunders, a director at Ofcom, the UK regulator, said the current UK phone network (Public Switched Telephone Network) is being updated to a new system (Voice Over Internet Protocol), which should be in place by 2025. Saunders said, "It's only when the vast majority of people are on the new technology (VOIP) that we can implement a new patch to address this problem [of Caller ID spoofing]."

In November 2022, Lindsey Fussell, Group Director for Networks and Communications at Ofcom, commented on the ongoing efforts to combat call spoofing in the UK. Fussell emphasized the inherent challenges in implementing new measures to block spoofed calls, noting the importance of not impacting legitimate communications. Her remarks highlight the need for a balanced approach and continuous collaboration among stakeholders to adapt to the evolving tactics of scammers.

In July 2025, Ofcom proposed requiring providers to withhold the caller ID on calls from abroad that show a UK mobile number unless the caller can be confirmed as a genuine customer. Providers were already required to block international calls displaying UK landline numbers; mobile numbers had been excluded partly to avoid blocking customers roaming abroad.

=== United States ===
Caller ID spoofing is generally illegal in the United States if done "with the intent to defraud, cause harm, or wrongfully obtain anything of value". The relevant federal statute, the Truth in Caller ID Act of 2009, does make exceptions for certain law-enforcement purposes. Callers are also still allowed to preserve their anonymity by choosing to block all outgoing caller ID information on their phone lines.

Under the act, which also targets VoIP services, it is illegal "to cause any caller identification service to knowingly transmit misleading or inaccurate caller identification information with the intent to defraud, cause harm, or wrongfully obtain anything of value...." Forfeiture penalties or criminal fines of up to $10,000 per violation (not to exceed $1,000,000) could be imposed. The law maintains an exemption for blocking one's own outgoing caller ID information, and law enforcement isn't affected.

The New York Times sent the number 111-111-1111 for all calls made from its offices until August 15, 2011. The fake number was intended to prevent the extensions of its reporters appearing in call logs, and thus protect reporters from having to divulge calls made to anonymous sources. The Times abandoned this practice because of the proposed changes to the caller ID law, and because many companies were blocking calls from the well-known number.

Starting in mid-2017, the FCC pushed forward Caller ID certification implemented using a framework known as STIR/SHAKEN. SHAKEN and STIR are acronyms for Signature-based Handling of Asserted Information Using toKENs and the Secure Telephone Identity Revisited standards, respectively. The FCC has mandated that telecom providers implement STIR/SHAKEN-based caller ID attestation in the IP portions of their networks beginning no later than June 30, 2021.

On August 1, 2019, the FCC voted to extend the Truth in Caller ID Act to international calls and text messaging. Congress passed the TRACED Act in 2019 which makes Caller ID authentication mandatory.

In 2024, Lingo Telecom, a Texas-based voice service provider, agreed to pay a $1 million fine in a settlement with the FCC. The company had transmitted AI-generated robocalls imitating President Joe Biden to New Hampshire voters before the state's Democratic presidential primary. The calls spoofed the number of a former state Democratic party official. The FCC cited Lingo's failure to properly implement STIR/SHAKEN as a key failing.

== See also ==
- Caller ID
- Truth in Caller ID Act of 2009
- Virtual number
