= Telephone numbers in Yugoslavia =

- Location of Yugoslavia
- Country: Yugoslavia
- Continent: Europe
- Numbering plan type: Open
- Format: (0xx) xx xxxx (0xxx) xxxxx (0xxx) xx xxxx
- Country code: 38
- International access: 99
- Long-distance: 0

Telephone numbers in Yugoslavia consisted of a three-digit area code followed by six digits. In Serbia, they mainly began with 1, 2 or 3, in Croatia 4 or 5, in Slovenia 6, Bosnia and Herzegovina 7 (and 8), in Montenegro 8 and in North Macedonia 9.

Yugoslavia's telephone country code was 38. On 1 October 1993, the 38 code space was broken up and the first digit of each area code integrated into each country's new country code. For example, Slovenia's country code became 386.

The internal numbers were also changed in some countries. For example, Skopje's call prefix 091 became 02, so (091) 12 3456 became (02) 12 3456, and later (02) 312 3456.

Serbia and Montenegro, however, shared country code 381 until 2006, when Montenegro became independent and was assigned 382. Country code 388 was not used by Montenegro, but for the European Telephony Numbering Space. 380 was assigned to Ukraine. After negotiations, in 2015 the 383 was assigned to Kosovo, which until then had used Serbian, Monaco (377) and Slovenian telephone networks. Country code 384 remains unassigned.

Exchange codes could not begin 0 or 9 due to the trunk prefix and emergency numbers, respectively. Since most of the new systems have changed their emergency number to the European standard of 112 and changed their international call prefix to 00, nowadays exchange codes cannot begin 0 or 1.

== Area codes ==
=== SR Bosnia and Herzegovina ===
- 70 - Jajce
- 71 - Sarajevo
- 72 - Zenica
- 73 - Goražde
- 74 - Doboj
- 75 - Tuzla
- 76 - Brčko
- 77 - Bihać
- 78 - Banja Luka
- 79 - Prijedor
- 80 - Livno
- 88 - Mostar
- 89 - Trebinje

=== SR Croatia ===
- 40 - Čakovec
- 41 - Zagreb
- 42 - Varaždin
- 43 - Bjelovar
- 44 - Sisak
- 45 - Kutina
- 47 - Karlovac
- 48 - Koprivnica
- 49 - Krapina
- 50 - Dubrovnik
- 51 - Rijeka
- 52 - Pula
- 53 - Gospić
- 54 - Osijek
- 55 - Slavonski Brod
- 56 - Vinkovci
- 560 - Našice
- 57 - Zadar
- 58 - Split
- 59 - Šibenik

=== SR Macedonia ===
- 901 - Kumanovo, Kratovo, Kriva Palanka
- 902 - Probishtip, Shtip, Sveti Nikole,
- 903 - Kočani, Vinica, Delchevo, Berovo, Pehchevo
- 904 - Strumica, Radovish
- 91 - Skopje
- 92 - Gostivar
- 93 - Titov Veles, Kavadarci, Negotino, Demir Kapija, Valandovo, Gevgelija
- 94 - Tetovo
- 95 - Kičevo, Makedonski Brod
- 96 - Struga, Ohrid, Debar
- 97 - Demir Hisar, Bitola, Resen
- 98 - Prilep, Krushevo

=== SR Montenegro ===
- 81 - Titograd, Danilovgrad, Kolašin
- 82 - Kotor, Tivat
- 83 - Nikšić, Plužine, Šavnik
- 84 - Bijelo Polje, Mojkovac
- 85 - Bar, Ulcinj
- 86 - Budva, Cetinje
- 871 - Andrijevica, Ivangrad, Plav, Rožaje
- 872 - Pljevlja, Žabljak
- 88 - Herceg Novi

=== SR Serbia ===
- 10 - Pirot
- 11 - Belgrade
- 12 - Požarevac
- 14 - Valjevo
- 15 - Šabac
- 16 - Leskovac
- 17 - Vranje
- 18 - Niš
- 19 - Zaječar
- 20 - Novi Pazar
- 26 - Smederevo
- 27 - Prokuplje
- 30 - Bor
- 31 - Titovo Užice
- 32 - Čačak
- 33 - Prijepolje
- 34 - Kragujevac
- 35 - Jagodina
- 36 - Kraljevo
- 37 - Kruševac

==== SAP Vojvodina ====
- 13 - Vršac
- 21 - Novi Sad
- 22 - Sremska Mitrovica
- 23 - Zrenjanin
- 230 - Kikinda
- 24 - Subotica
- 25 - Sombor

==== SAP Kosovo ====
- 28 - Titova Mitrovica, Leposavić, Vučitrn, Srbica, Zvečan, Zubin Potok, North Mitrovica
- 280 - Gnjilane, Vitina, Kosovska Kamenica, Parteš, Ranilug, Klokot
- 29 - Prizren, Suva Reka, Dragaš, Mamuša, Mališevo
- 290 - Uroševac, Đeneral Janković, Kačanik, Štrpce, Štimlje
- 38 - Priština, Glogovac, Gračanica, Kosovo Polje, Lipljan, Novo Brdo, Obilić, Podujevo
- 39 - Peć, Istok, Klina
- 390 - Đakovica, Dečani, Junik, Orahovac

=== SR Slovenia ===
- 61 - Ljubljana
  - 601 - Trbovlje
- 62 - Maribor
  - 602 - Ravne na Koroškem
- 63 - Celje
- 64 - Gorenjska (Kranj)
- 65 - Nova Gorica
- 66 - Koper
- 67 - Postojna
- 68 - Novo Mesto
  - 608 - Krško
- 69 - Prekmurje (Murska Sobota)

=== Emergency/other numbers ===
- 92 - police
- 93 - fire
- 94 - ambulance
- 95 - speaking clock
- 985 - civil protection
- 987 - AMSJ
- 988 - White pages (phone book)
- 99 - international call prefix
