= Numbuster =

Mobile Phone

NumBuster!
- Developer: Goodline Softwares W.L.L.
- Release: 2013
- Operating system: Android; iOS
- Available in: Arabic, Armenian, Azerbaijani, Chinese, Czech, English, French, Georgian, Greek, Hebrew, Hindi, Indonesian, Italian, Japanese, Kazakh, Korean, Malay, Polish, Portuguese, Russian, Serbian, Spanish, Thai, Turkish, Ukrainian, Vietnamese
- Type: Caller ID, Spam blocker, Telephone directory, phone call reverse lookup
- License: Proprietary
- Website: numbuster.com

Goodline Softwares
- Company type: W.L.L.
- Available in: English
- Headquarters: Manama, Bahrain
- No. of locations: 1
- Industry: IT software
- Products: NumBuster!
- Employees: 30
- Website: numbuster.com
- Current status: active

NumBuster! is a phone community that users can access via a mobile phone client and a Web application. Developed by NumBuster Ltd, it allows users to find contact details of any phone number, exchange information about numbers with other users and block calls and messages. The client is available for Android and Apple iOS.

== History ==
NumBuster! was developed by NumBuster Ltd, a privately held company. The project was launched on Android in May 2013 and as a Web site in February 2014. As of September 2014, it has more than 100 000 users in the CIS, where it was first launched.

In July–August 2014, NumBuster! was accelerated in the biggest startup accelerator in France, NUMA Paris.

In 2016, the rights to the project were transferred to the Cyprus-based company Gilraen Limited.

In 2025, the project was acquired by Goodline Softwares W.L.L., a company headquartered in Bahrain, which currently oversees its global operations and development.

As of 2025, the project reports more than 20 million installations worldwide.

== Features and functionality ==
The service is a global telephone directory featuring social networking, call, and SMS blocking capabilities. It enables users to identify unfamiliar callers and SMS senders — including those from WhatsApp and other messaging platforms — whether they are individuals or businesses.

Beyond identification, the platform allows users to add personal notes to any phone number and participate in the community by rating and commenting on contacts. Additionally, NumBuster! functions as a mobile marketplace and business directory, where users can create digital cards to showcase their products and services directly on their profile. This transforms the contact list into a searchable catalog of goods and services linked to specific phone numbers, providing added value to the global community.

Apart from that, users can block any phone number.

Application is available on Android from May 2013 and on Apple iPhone from September 2014.

== Languages and localization ==
NumBuster! is available in 27 languages: Arabic, Armenian, Azerbaijani, Chinese (Simplified and Hong Kong), Czech, English, French, Georgian, Greek, Hebrew, Hindi, Indonesian, Italian, Japanese, Kazakh, Korean, Malay, Polish, Portuguese, Russian, Serbian, Spanish, Thai, Turkish, Ukrainian, and Vietnamese.

== Reception ==
Upon its release, NumBuster! gathered positive feedback from bloggers and media, including a publication in a leading news web-site.

== See also ==
- List of most downloaded Android applications
- Truth in Caller ID Act of 2009
