= E164 =

E164 may refer to:

- E164, the E number for saffron
- E.164, an international public telecommunication numbering plan
