= National conventions for writing telephone numbers =

National conventions for writing telephone numbers vary by country. The International Telecommunication Union (ITU) publishes a recommendation entitled Notation for national and international telephone numbers, e-mail addresses and Web addresses. Recommendation E.123 specifies the format of telephone numbers assigned to telephones and similar communication endpoints in national telephone numbering plans.

In examples, a numeric digit is used only if the digit is the same in every number, and letters to illustrate groups. X is used as a wildcard character to represent any digit in lists of numbers.

== Africa ==
=== Djibouti ===
All telephone numbers in Djibouti have eight digits.

Fixed line numbers start with 21 or 27, then a fixed line locality code, followed by four digits.

Mobile numbers start with 77, then a mobile line locality code, followed by four digits.

With the country code of Djibouti (253), the international format is "+253 XX YY ZZZZ".

=== Kenya ===
Telephone numbers in Kenya use a 9-digit format. The nine digits used for local calls start with a "0" (trunk prefix) for domestic calls, followed by the 3-digit area/provider code and the final six digits (07XX XXX XXX). The international code for Kenya is "+254".

=== Morocco ===
All telephone numbers in Morocco have ten digits (initial 0 plus nine numbers).

Landline numbers start with 05, followed by three or four digits for the regional area R, then five or four digits for the subscriber number XXXXX: ("05RRR-XXXXX" or “05RRRR-XXXX”).

Mobile numbers start with 06 or 07, followed by the two digits of the mobile network number, then six digits for the subscriber number ("06YY-XXXXXX" or "07YY-XXXXXX"), where Y is the mobile network (GSM) number.

The country code for Morocco is 212, so the format becomes "+212 YXX-XXXXXX", where Y is 5 for landlines or 6/7 for mobile. Free calling numbers (green numbers) or call center numbers start with 080 or 090 with format “080-XXXXXXX”.

=== South Africa ===
South Africa uses 10-digit dialling, which has been required since 16 January 2007. The ten digits used for local calls (AAA XXX XXXX or 0AA XXX XXXX) consist of a 3-digit area/type code (the first digit in the area/type code is a trunk prefix) followed by seven digits. All area codes, including mobile numbers, start with a "0" (trunk prefix) for domestic calls. When dialing from another country, the country code for South Africa is "27", with the rest of the digits excluding the "0" trunk prefix (+27 AA XXX XXXX).

== Asia ==
=== China ===
Telephone numbers in China have 10 or 11 digits (excluding an initial zero which is required at times) and fall in at least four distinct categories:

1. Landlines: In China, the length of phone numbers varies from city to city. It is usually written as (0XXX) YYY YYYY (For landlines registered in large metropolises, it is written in the format (0XXX) YYYY YYYY), where 0 is the trunk code, XXX is the area code (2 or 3 digits) and YYYY YYYY is the local number (7 or 8 digits). For example, (0755) XXXX YYYY indicates a Shenzhen number. XXXXYYYY is dialed locally, 0755 XXXX YYYY is dialed in other areas inside the country, while, for international calls to Shenzhen, the 0 is dropped and is written +86 755 XXXX YYYY.
2. Mobiles: The 11-digit code is always written in full in the whole China e.g. 1WX YYYY ZZZZ. Each WX is assigned to a service provider while W is usually '3' through '9'. The remaining eight digits are the subscriber number.
3. Toll Free: These are usually ten digit numbers beginning with 800 or 400. 800 (toll-free) are accessible only when called from landline phones, while 400 (shared toll) are accessible from all phones. 400 XXX XXXX or 800 XXXX XXXX.
4. Service numbers: These are usually 3- to 5-digit numbers (e.g. Police is 110) used to access an emergency service (Fire 119, Ambulance 120, Police 110, Roadside assistance 12122) or a value-added service.

=== Hong Kong and Macau ===
Every number, except special service numbers, is an 8-digit number; they are grouped as XXXX YYYY. There are no area codes.

=== India ===
Telephone numbers in India have ten digits (excluding an initial zero which is required at times) and fall into at least four distinct categories:

- Landlines: Written as AAA-BBBBBBB, where AAA is the Subscriber Trunk Dialing code (long-distance code) and BBBBBBB is the phone number. The total length of the Subscriber Trunk Dialing code and the phone number is ten digits. The Subscriber Trunk Dialing code can have from two digits (11 or 011) up to four digits.
- Mobiles: Written as AAAAA-BBBBB for ease of remembering (though the prefix is either 2-digits or 4-digits in the numbering plan). Mobile numbers which are not local need to be prefixed by a 0 while dialing, or by +91 (91 is the country code for India). A mobile number written as +91-AAAAA BBBBB is valid throughout India, and in other countries where the + is recognized as a prefix to the country code. Since 2015, calls from mobile phones to any other mobiles do not need to prefix with a 0. However, calls from landlines to non-local mobile numbers need to be prefixed with 0.
- Toll Free: These are usually ten digit numbers beginning with 1-800. Sometimes they are accessible (or are toll-free) only when called from the government-owned telephone corporation, BSNL/MTNL.
- Service numbers: These are usually three or four digit numbers (e.g. Emergency Number is 112) used to access an emergency service (Fire, Ambulance, Police, Roadside assistance) or a value-added service.

=== Iran ===
All telephone numbers in Iran have 11 digits (initial 0 and ten digits). The first two or three digits after the zero are the area code. The possibilities are: (0xx) xxxx xxxx (for landlines), 09xx xxx xxxx (for cellphones) and 099xx xxx xxx (for MVNO).

When making a call within the same landline area code, initial 0 plus the area code must be omitted.

An example for calling telephones in the city of Tehran is as follows:

- xxxx xxxx (within Tehran, via a landline)
- 021 xxxx xxxx (Outside Tehran, or via a cellphone)
- +98 21 xxxx xxxx (outside Iran)

An example for mobile numbers is as follows:

- 09xx xxx xxxx (in Iran)
- +98 9xx xxx xxxx (outside Iran)

=== Japan ===
The traditional convention for phone numbers is (0AA) NXX-XXXX, where 0AA is the area code and NXX-XXXX is the subscriber number. This number format is very similar to the North American numbering plan, but the country has a trunk code of 0 instead of 1, so international callers (using +81) do not have to dial the trunk code 0 when calling to Japan. Telephone numbers had nine digits in Tokyo and Osaka until the late 1990s, when a seventh digit was added to the subscriber number. Densely populated areas have shorter area codes, while rural areas have longer area codes, but the last two digits of a five-digit area code (including the first zero) may also be the first two digits of the subscriber number. Area codes increase from north to south, except in areas such as the western Hokuriku region and the prefecture of Okinawa, where area codes increase from west to east or south to north.

Some telephone numbers deviate from this rule:

- Toll-free dialing and Navi Dial operations (0120-XX-XXXX, 0570-XX-XXXX) where XX-XXXX is the subscriber number
- The area codes 050 and 0800 (toll-free dialing) use an 11 digit phone number (050-XXXX-XXXX; 0800-XXX-XXXX) where XXXX-XXXX is the subscriber number
- 110 and 119 are examples of three digit emergency numbers

=== Malaysia ===
All area codes including mobile start with a "0" (trunk prefix) for domestic calls. If you are dialing from another country the country code for Malaysia is "60" which may be confusing; do not dial an extra "0" before the rest of the digits. For fixed line and mobile phone numbers, a dash is written in between the area/mobile code and the subscriber number, with an optional space before the last four digits of the subscriber number. For example, a fixed line number in Kuala Lumpur is written as 03-XXXX YYYY or 03-XXXXYYYY, while a fixed line number in Kota Kinabalu is written as 088-XX YYYY or 088-XXYYYY. A typical mobile phone number is written as 01M-XXX YYYY or 01M-XXXYYYY. Toll-free and local charge numbers are written as 1-800-XX-YYYY and 1-300-XX-YYYY respectively, while premium rate numbers are written as 600-XX-YYYY.

=== Pakistan ===
Telephone numbers in Pakistan have two parts. Area codes in Pakistan have from two to five digits; the smaller the city, the longer the prefix. All the large cities have two-digit codes.

Smaller towns have a six digit number. Large cities have seven-digit numbers. Azad Jammu and Kashmir has five digit numbers. On 1 July 2009, telephone numbers in Karachi and Lahore were changed from seven digits to eight digits. This was accomplished by adding the digit "9" to the beginning of any phone number that started with a "9" (government and semi-government connections), and adding the digit "3" to any phone numbers that did not start with the number "9".

It is common to write phone numbers as (0xx) yyyyyyy, where xx is the area code. The 0 prefix is for trunk (long-distance) dialing from within the country. International callers should dial +92 xx yyyyyyyy.

All mobile phone codes have four digits, and start with 03xx. All mobile numbers have seven digits, and denote the mobile provider on a nationwide basis and not geographic location. Thus all Telenor numbers (for example) nationwide carry mobile code 0345 etc.

Universal access number

- 111 xxx xxx

Emergency Service Numbers

- 1xx
- 1xxx

Premium Rate services:

- 0900 xxxxx

Toll free numbers (For callers within Pakistan):

- 0800 xxxxx

=== Philippines ===
Landline numbers are eleven digits long and written as +63 (XX) YYY ZZZZ for international callers. For domestic calls, the country code (+63) is omitted and a trunk prefix (0) is placed. For local calls, both the trunk prefix (0) and the area code are omitted. Mobile numbers are twelve digits long and written as +63 (XXX) YYY ZZZZ or 0 (XXX) YYY ZZZZ.

=== Singapore ===
In Singapore, every phone number is written as +65-XXXX-YYYY or +65 XXXX YYYY.

Mobile phones starts with 8/9, landline phone numbers starts with 6 while VOIP numbers starts with 3.

Subscriber numbers have eight digits and there are no area codes.

=== South Korea ===
South Korean phone numbers can be as short as seven digits and as long as 11 digits, because, when making a local call (i.e. in the same city), there is no need to dial the area code. South Korean area codes are assigned based on city.

==== Landline phone numbers ====
Landline home numbers are usually written as: 0XX-XXX-XXXX or (0XX) XXX-XXXX where 0XX indicates an area code. (0XX) XXX-XXX and 0XX XXX XXXX (without hyphens) are comprehensible as well. The area code may have two digits for some cities such as Seoul and Gwacheon (these two cities use the same area code) and three digits for other cities such as Incheon, Busan and most of the cities in Gyeonggi-do. The middle three-digit part is extended to four digits in many areas due to the increased number of telephone users.

In the international context, 82 0XX-XXX-XXXX is commonly used as well. For international calls, "0" in the area code is often omitted, because it is not necessary to dial 0 from foreign countries. Therefore, it is better written as: 82-(0)XX-XXX-XXXX or 82-(0)XX-XXXX-XXXX The plus (+) sign is often added to the country code (e.g., +82 0XX-XXX-XXXX or +82-0XX-XXXX-XXXX).

==== Mobile phone numbers ====
For mobile numbers, 016490641 so on. As with the landline home numbers, the mobile numbers' middle three-digit part is extended to four digits (e.g., 016490641) due to the increased number of mobile phone users.

==== Business numbers ====
If a number starts with 070, the number does not belong to any particular area, and is a number given by an Internet telephone service. In this case, 070 is not usually put in the brackets, neither ( ) nor ).

In the business context, the numbers in the format of 15XX-XXXX and 16XX-XXXX are business representative agency or customer services. While the numbers starting with 080 (e.g., 080-XXX-XXXX) are also business-related numbers but are usually toll-free customer service centers. Also in this case, 15XX, 16XX or 070 are not put in the brackets, neither ( ) nor ).

==== National service numbers ====
There are national telephone services which have phone numbers in the format of 1XX or 1XXX, without any area code. For example, 114 is for telephone yellow page, 119 is for fire/emergency number, 112 is for police station center, 131 is for weather forecast information, 1333 is for traffic information, and so on. The number 111 is for reporting spies, especially from North Korea. It used to be 113, so most of senior citizen still believe it is the number for reporting spies. These numbers do not need any brackets.

==== Alternative numbers ====
If there are multiple numbers used for one person/entity, the symbol "~" is usually used to avoid repetitions. For example, if one company has three phone numbers—031-111-1111, 031-111-1112 and 031-111-1113—then they are shortened as in 031-111-1111~3.

If the numbers are not consecutive, then the last digit is written together with commas. For example, if a company has three numbers—031-111-1111, 031-111-1115, 031-111-1119, then they are shortened as in 031-111-1111, 5, 9.

=== Sri Lanka ===
Except for short codes and emergency numbers, all telephone numbers in Sri Lanka have ten digits (initial 0 + nine numbers).

Landline phone numbers begin with the area code, then one digit for the operator code, then six digits for the primary telephone number.

Format: (XXX Y ZZZZZZ) where:

- "xxx" denotes the area code. All area codes begin with the number 0.
- The operator code for fixed (landline) numbers is "y".
- "zzzzzz" denotes the primary telephone number, which has six digits.

Mobile numbers start with the mobile operator code (which begins from 07X, followed by seven digits for the main telephone number).

Format: (XXX ZZZZZZZ) where:

- When dialing a mobile number, "xxx" represents the mobile operator code. All mobile operator codes begin with the number 07.
- "zzzzzzz" represents the main telephone number of seven digits.

The country code for Sri Lanka is 94, so the format becomes "+94 XX Y ZZZZZZ" for landlines and the format becomes "+94 XX ZZZZZZZ" for mobile numbers.

=== Taiwan ===
Landline numbers in Taiwan are written with the area code in parentheses [with phone numbers total nine digits] Example: (02) XXXX YYYY for phone numbers in Taipei area.

Mobile phones have 3 digit "company code" assigned to different mobile service carriers such as (09**) XXXXXX followed by a 6 digit phone number. (note: Mobile carriers could have multiple company codes)

=== Thailand ===
All numbers in Thailand, whether for landlines or mobile reception, consist of eight digits, xxxx xxxx in the government's official format. When calling domestically, landline numbers are preceded by a zero (0 xxxx xxxx, example 0 5381 0595) while mobile numbers are preceded by 0 plus one digit (0x xxxx xxxx, example 06 9756 4509). Thais often confuse the current numbering system with the old provincial area code system, which no longer exists as area codes were integrated into all phone numbers in 2005. Because of this, unofficially people often write numbers as 0xx xxx xxx (053 810 595). Calling a Thai phone number from outside Thailand, one drops the 0 and adds the 66 country code. Example +66 5381 0595.

== Oceania ==
=== Australia ===
Most Australian telephone numbers have ten digits, and are generally written 0A BBBB BBBB or 04XX XXX XXX for mobile telephone numbers, where 0A is the optional "area code" (2,3,7,8) and BBBB BBBB is the subscriber number. (http://www.acma.gov.au/Industry/Telco/Numbering/Numbering-Plan/phone-number-meanings-numbering-i-acma)

When the number is to be seen by an international audience, it is written +61 A BBBB BBBB or +61 4XX XXX XXX. When written for a local audience, the optional area code is omitted. The area code is often written within parentheses (0A) BBBB BBBB. Mobile numbers should never have parentheses.

Ten-digit non-geographic numbers beginning with 1 are written 1X0Y BBB BBB, where X = 8 for toll free numbers, X = 3 for fixed-fee numbers and X = 9 for premium services. Six-digit non-geographic numbers are written 13 BB BB or 13B BBB; these are fixed-fee numbers. Seven-digit 180 BBBB numbers also exist. 'B's are sometimes written as letters.

=== New Zealand ===
Almost all New Zealand telephone numbers have seven digits, with a single-digit access code and a single-digit area code for long-distance domestic calls. Traditionally, the number was given as (0A) BBB-BBBB, with the two first digits (the STD code) often omitted for local calls. The brackets and the dash are also often omitted. Mobile numbers follow the same format, but with the area code being two digits, i.e. (02M) BBB-BBBB. ( Some mobile numbers are longer: (021)02BBBBBB, (021)08BBBBBB, (020)40BBBBBB, (020) 41BBBBBB and (028) 25BBBBBB; and some are shorter: (021)3BBBBB, (021)4BBBBB, (021)5BBBBB, (021)6BBBBB, (021)7BBBBB, (021)8BBBBB and (021)9BBBBB)

There are also free-phone numbers (starting with 0800 or 0508) that are given in the format 0800-AAA-AAA. It is not uncommon for the 0800 and 0508 to be enclosed in brackets, although this is not strictly correct as the brackets denote optional parts of the number, and the 0800 and 0508 is required.

Recently with 8 digit mobile numbers becoming more common the prefix-4 digits-4 digits format has been adopted for readability: 022 1234 5678.

For international use, the prefix 64 is substituted for the leading zero, giving +64-A-BBB-BBBB for land-lines, and +64-MM-BBB-BBBB for mobile numbers.

== Europe ==
=== Belgium ===
Belgian telephone numbers consist of three parts: First '0', secondly the "zone prefix" (A) which has one or two digits for landlines and three digits for mobile phones, and thirdly the "subscriber's number" (B).

Land lines always have nine digits. They are prefixed by a zero, followed by the zone prefix. Depending on the length of the zone prefix, the subscriber's number consists of either 6 or 7 digits. Hence land line numbers are written either 0AA BB BB BB or 0A BBB BB BB.

Mobile phone numbers always consist of ten digits. The first digit of the "zone prefix" of a mobile number is always '4'. Then follows 2 digits indicating to which Mobile Operator's pool the number originally belonged when it was taken into usage. The fourth digit represents a "sub-group" of this pool and has no additional meaning other than increasing the amount of possible numbers. The subscriber's number consists of six digits. Hence, mobile phone numbers are written 04AA BB BB BB. Sometimes, the last six digits are written in two groups of 3 digits to increase readability: 04AA BBB BBB.

Numbers are sometimes written with a slash in between the zone prefix and the subscriber's number. This is the case for both land lines and mobile phone numbers. Sometimes, dots are written between the blocks of the subscriber's number. Examples: 0AA/BB BB BB, 0AA/BB.BB.BB; for mobile numbers: 04AA/BB BB BB, 04AA/BB.BB.BB or 04AA/BBB.BBB.

The country code for Belgium is "32". When dialing a number with the prefix, the 0 can be dropped, e.g.: +32 9055.

=== Denmark ===
Danish telephone numbers have eight digits and are normally written

- in four groups of two digits each, with the groups separated by spaces: AA AA AA AA,
- in two groups of four digits each, with the groups separated by a space: AAAA AAAA,
- in one group of two digits followed by two groups of three digits each, with the groups separated by spaces: AA AAA AAA, or
- all in one go: AAAAAAAA.

The third option, AA AAA AAA is not commonly used for personal (landline or mobile) numbers, but is mostly found in corporate numbers, especially in advertizing. The standard formats – which when spoken divide numbers into ranges from 00 (zero zero) to 99 (ninety-nine) – limit the possible range of the ability to create telephone numbers that are easy to remember; dividing the numbers into groups of three expands the mnemonic possibilities.

Danish emergency and service numbers have three digits and are written AAA. Danish short numbers used for text messaging services have four digits and are written AAAA.

=== France ===
French telephone numbers have ten digits, usually written in groups of two separated by spaces, in the format 0A BB BB BB BB where 0 (the trunk prefix) was created in 1996 to be a carrier selection code, and A is the "territorial area code" included in the subscriber number A BB BB BB BB.

Sometimes, it is also written in the format 0A.BB.BB.BB.BB using periods instead of spaces, but this is less common.

The A (territorial area code) can be 1 to 5 (for geographic-based numbers, according to location: Paris/Suburbs, northwest France, northeast France, southeast France, and southwest France, respectively), and it designates nationwide numbers when it is 6 or 7 (mobile numbers), 8 (special numbers), or 9 (phone over IP over xDSL/non-geographic numbers).

The numbering plan is a closed one; all digits must always be dialed.

The first two or three B can designate the area (old area code) for geographic numbers, or the operator to whom the number resource belongs.

There are also "short numbers" for emergencies (such as 112), that are written 1C or 1CC; and short numbers for special services, written 10 CC, 11C CCC, or 36 CC. 00 is the international access code.

International format is +33 A BB BB BB BB where the leading trunk prefix 0 disappears (it must not be dialed from abroad). This format can be directly used in mobile phones.

=== Germany ===
German telephone numbers have no fixed length for area code and subscriber number (an open numbering plan).

There are many ways to format a telephone number in Germany. The most prominent is DIN 5008 but the international format E.123 and Microsoft's canonical address format are also very common.

Trunk access code is 0 and international call prefix code is 00.

Form	Example
DIN 5008	0AAAA BBBBBB
DIN 5008 with Extension	0AAAA BBBBBB-XX
DIN 5008 international	+49 AAAA BBBBBB
E.123 local	(0AAAA) BBBBBB
E.123 international	+49 AAAA BBBBBB
Microsoft	+49 (AAAA) BBBBBB
Old	0AAAA-BBBBBB
Very old	0AAAA/BBBBBB-XX

Numbers are often written in blocks of two. Example: +49 (A AA) B BB BB (Note the blocks go from right to left)

The (very) old format and E.123 local form are still in use, sometimes for technical reasons.

=== Greece ===
Greek telephone numbers have ten digits, and usually written AAB BBBBBBB or AAAB BBBBBB where AAB or AAAB is the 2- or 3-digit national area code plus the first digit of the subscriber number, and BBBBBBB or BBBBBB are the remaining digits of the subscriber number. The entire number must always be dialed, even if calling within the same local area; therefore, the national destination code is not separated from the subscriber number. According to international convention, numbers are sometimes written +30 AAB BBBBBBB or +30 AAAB BBBBBB to include the country code.

=== Hungary ===
In Hungary the standard lengths for area codes is two, except for Budapest (the capital), which has the area code 1. Subscribers' numbers have six digits in general. Numbers in Budapest and cell phone numbers have seven digits.

=== Iceland ===
Phone numbers in Iceland have seven digits and generally written in the form XXX XXXX or XXX-XXXX.

=== Ireland ===
Phone numbers in Ireland are part of an open numbering plan with varying number lengths. The area code system is similar to that in some other northern European countries. Unlike the UK, Irish fixed line numbering is divided into a number of regions which are (except Dublin) further subdivided in a hierarchical structure, with the largest town often (but not always) taking 0A1.

Area codes start with a trunk prefix "0" and extend for up to four digits but usually 3; followed by the local phone number of up to seven digits.

In industry jargon, these area codes and prefixes are referred to as NDCs (National Dialing Codes). This is the term used by ComReg and technical documents, as they include non-geographic codes. Historically, like the UK, the term STD code (Subscriber Trunk Dialling) was used. However, the terminology is archaic and is no longer universally understood and should not be used to avoid confusion.

Dublin uses the shorter (01) code which is not further subdivided. Other cities and major towns usually have codes ending in 1. Cork for example is 021, Galway 091, Limerick 061 etc.

The leading zero is always omitted when dialling from outside the country.

Local phone numbers have either 5, 6 or 7-digits. In 7-digit numbering they are usually grouped as BBB BBBB, 6-digit numbers are grouped BBB BBB and 5-digit numbers are normally all grouped together BBBBB

Grouping of numbers is not strictly adhered to, but usually fairly consistent. The area code should always be kept separated with a space or surrounded by brackets and not merged into the local number.

The use of hyphens is discouraged, particularly on websites as it can prevent mobile browsers identifying the number as a clickable link for easier dialling.

Fixed line numbers are normally presented as follows:

- 01 BBB BBBB for a Dublin number (7 digit)
- 021 BBB BBBB for a Cork number (7 digit)
- 064 BBB BBBB for a Killarney number (7 digit)
- 061 BBB BBB for a Limerick number (6 digit)
- 098 BBBBB for a Westport number (5 digit)
- 0404 BBBBB for a Wicklow number (5 digit)

Area codes may also be surrounded by brackets, but this practice is falling out of use, as local dialing without the area code is optional on landlines and the area code must always be dialled on mobile phones.

The Irish telecommunication regulator, ComReg has been gradually rationalising area codes by merging and extending local numbering to 7-digits in the format 0AA BBB BBBB. This is being carried out only where necessary to avoid disruption. This means that varying fixed line number lengths will continue to exist in Ireland for the foreseeable future.

Mobile numbers are presented as follows:

08A BBB BBBB

Brackets should not be used around the mobile prefix as it is never optional and must always be dialled, even from another phone with the same prefix.

Special rate numbers, such as free phone/toll free and premium rate are usually grouped:

Freephone: 1800 BB BB BB or (spoken as one-eight-hundred) Local rate: 0818 BB BB BB or (spoken as Oh-eight-one-eight)

Formerly (officially removed) 1850 BB BB BB (eighteen-fifty)

Formerly (officially removed) 1550 BB BB BB (read as fifteen-fifty)

However, for memorability, this is not consistently adhered to.

Alphanumeric characters can also be used in presenting numbers for added memorability, but it is much less common than in North America.

For example: 18AA 99 TAXI

Note: These special rate numbers are not reachable from outside Ireland.

=== Italy ===
Phone numbers in Italy have variable length. There's no well established convention about how to group digits or which symbol to use, but this is hardly an issue since all the digits are always dialed.

=== Netherlands ===
Since 10 October 1995 (Operation Decibel) all telephone numbers in the Netherlands have ten digits (including the trunk prefix '0'). The area code ('A') is commonly separated with a dash ('-') and sometimes a space from the subscriber's number ('B'). Alternatively, the area code (including the trunk prefix) can be enclosed in parentheses.

The length of the area code for landlines is either 2 or 3 digits, depending on the population density of the area. This leaves 7 or 6 digits for the subscriber's number, resulting in a format of either 0AA-BBBBBBB or 0AAA-BBBBBB. Cellphone numbers are assigned the 1-digit area code 6, leaving eight digits for the subscriber's number: 06-CBBBBBBB, where subscriber's number ('C') is neither 6 nor 7. Service numbers (area codes 800, 900, 906 and 909) have either 4 or 7 remaining digits, making them 8 or 11 digits in total: 0AAA-BBBB or 0AAA-BBBBBBB. The area code 14 has no trunk prefix and is used for government numbers, currently only for municipalities. The remaining digits represent the area code of the municipality. Therefore, the length 14 numbers total either 5 or 6 digits: 14 0AA or 14 0AAA

The trunk prefix '0' is dropped when prefixed by the country code: +31 AA BBBBBBBB, +31 6 CBBBBBBB, etcetera. Note that there is not a trunk prefix for the 14 series so the international number becomes +31 14 0AAA.

=== Norway ===
Norwegian telephone numbers have eight digits. A number to a fixed line is written in four groups of two separated by spaces, AA AA AA AA. Phone numbers in the 8xx series are written in three groups, AAA AA AAA. This makes it easy to determine if the B-number is SMS capable. Mobile numbers start with 4 or 9.

=== Poland ===
Telephone numbers in Poland have nine digits. For mobile phones, the preferred format is AAA-AAA-AAA. For landline phones, the preferred format is AA-BBB-BB-BB, where AA is area code. Occasionally, you can encounter numbers formatted as (AA) BBB-BB-BB. Omitting area code is not permitted, because nowadays it is always required.

=== Portugal ===
Telephone numbers in Portugal have nine digits. A number to a fixed line is written in three groups of two separated by spaces, AAA AAA AAA. Cellphone numbers are written in three groups, AAA AAA AAA. Mobile numbers start with 9.

=== Romania ===
Starting with 2002 phone numbers in Romania have ten digits, the first digit always being 0. The preferred format is AAAA-AAA-AAA for mobile, except for landline phones in Bucharest where the preferred format is AAA-AAA-AA-AA.

=== Russia ===
Russia has an open numbering plan with 10-digit phone numbers. Trunk prefix is 8 (or 8~CC when using alternative operators, where CC is 21–23, 52–55). International call prefix is 8~10 (or 8~CC when using alternative operators, where CC is 26–29, 56–59). The country code is 7.

Length of geographical area codes (A) is usually 3 to 5 digits; length of non-geographical area codes is 3. The groups of digits in the local subscriber's number (B) are separated by dashes ('-'): BBB-BB-BB, BB-BB-BB, B-BB-BB. The area code is included in parentheses, similarly to E.123 local notation: (AAA) BBB-BB-BB, (AAAA) BB-BB-BB, (AAAAA) B-BB-BB.

Area code dialing is optional in most geographical area codes, except Moscow (area codes 495, 498, 499); it is mandatory for non-geographical area codes. E.123 international and Microsoft formats are used for writing local phone numbers as well; international prefix and country code 7 are replaced with trunk code 8 (or 8~CC) when dialing a mandatory area code.

Even though trunk code is not needed for calls within the same geographical area, recent convention adds the default trunk code to the phone number notation: 8 (AAAA) BB-BB-BB. For mandatory area code dealing plans, notation 8 AAAA BB-BB-BB is used. These formats are a mix of Microsoft format and E.123 local notation.

Mobile phones require full 10-digit number which starts with 3-digit non-geographical area codes 900–990. For international calls abroad or international roaming calls to Russia, E.123 international notation with an international call prefix '+' is the only allowed calling number format. For local calls both 8 and 7 are accepted as a trunk code.

Form	Example
Old	BBB-BB-BB
Old with area code	(AAA) BBB-BB-BB
Conventional	8 (AAA) BBB-BB-BB
Microsoft	+7 (AAA) BBB-BB-BB
Conventional (mandatory area code)	8 AAA BBB-BB-BB
E.123 international	+7 AAA BBB BB BB

=== Spain ===
Spanish telephone numbers have nine digits, starting with '9' or '8' for fixed lines (excluding '90x' and '80x') or with '6' or '7' for mobile phones.

The first group in fixed lines always identifies the dialed province. That group might be of 2 or 3 digits; for example, 91 and 81 are for Madrid while 925 and 825 are for Toledo. The second group is always of 3 digits as it formerly identified the telephone exchange (it now identifies the telephone area).

When the first group has two digits (as in Madrid), the number is usually written in four groups of 2-3-2-2 digits (AB CCC DD DD)

When the first group has three digits (as in Toledo), the number is usually written in 3 groups of 3 digits (ABB CCC DDD) but the form 3-2-2-2 (ABB CC CD DD) is not uncommon.

Mobile numbers are usually grouped by threes, ABB CCC CCC, but the form 3-2-2-2 is also seen.

=== Sweden ===
Swedish telephone numbers have between eight and ten digits. They start with a two to four digit area code. A three digit code starting with 07 indicates that the number is for a mobile phone. All national numbers start with one leading 0, and international destinations are specified by the prefix 00 or +. The numbers are written with the area code followed by a hyphen, and then two to three groups of digits separated by spaces.

Type	Format
National 10 digit	0A-XXX XXX XX; 0AA-XXX XX XX; 0AAA-XX XX XX
National 9 digit	0A-XXX XX XX; 0AA-XX XX XX; 0AAA-XXX XX
National 8 digit	0A-XX XX XX; 0AA-XXX XX
Mobile 10 digit	07A-XXX XX XX; 07AA-XX XX XX
International	+CC AAA-XXX XX XX; 00CC AAA-XXX XX XX

=== Switzerland ===
Swiss telephone numbers have ten digits, and usually written 0AA BBB BB BB where 0AA is the national destination code and BBB BB BB is the subscriber number. The entire number must always be dialed, including the leading 0, even if calling within a local area, therefore the national destination code is not separated from the subscriber number. According to international convention, numbers are sometimes written +41 AA BBB BB BB to include the country code. Certain nationwide destination codes, such as for toll-free or premium-rate telephone numbers, are written 0800 BBB BBB or 0900 BBB BBB. Short numbers are used for emergency services such as 112 that are written 1CC or 1CCC.

=== Turkey ===
In Turkey the format for telephone numbers is commonly seen as 0BBB AAA AA AA. While landline numbers having the prefix 02BB AAA AA AA, 03BB AAA AA AA, or 04BB AAA AA AA mobile numbers have the prefix 05BB AAA AA AA. Landline area codes are separated by cities and only one city, Istanbul, has two area codes: 216 for the Asian side, and 212 for the European side. Mobile numbers however are separated by carriers. There are three mobile carriers in Turkey: Vodafone TR, Turkcell and Turk Telekom. Turkcell has the prefix 053B AAA AA AA, Vodafone TR has the prefix 054B AAA AA AA, and Turk Telekom has the prefix 055B AAA AA AA.

Since 9 November 2008, with the passing of the Number Carriability Regulation by ICTA, mobile numbers can be carried from one mobile carrier to the other, without having to change the prefix. This caused dialing 05BB to call another number on the same carrier to become mandatory. Calls to numbers which were carried to another operator are signaled by a unique sound upon dialing, to signify that the recipient is on another network and alert them against potentially unwanted interconnection charges. The same regulation passed on 10 September 2009 regarding landline numbers, without the requirement to dial the prefix among numbers with the same geographical area, sharing the same prefix.

The "0" on every prefix is an Area Code Exit code that must be dialed when a number with a different area code is being called. So when calling from outside of Turkey those 0s are not dialed. The dialing format when calling from outside Turkey is +90 BBB AAA AA AA and NOT +90 0BBB AAA AA AA. Unlike the North American system, the Country Exit Code isn't 011 but 00. So it is one "0" to exit area and one more "0" to exit the country.

=== Ukraine ===
There are many recommendations for recording phone numbers. The most common in the world is Recommendation E.123 E.123 International Telecommunication Union and the standard format for Microsoft telephone numbers Microsoft.

There is an international format for recording a telephone number containing the country code, settlement code and telephone number, and the national format containing the settlement code and telephone number.

To record Ukrainian telephone numbers, telephone codes for settlements do not have an initial zero, long-distance prefix: 0.

Writing telephone numbers
Phone number	Note
+380 44 123 4567	E.123, international format: country code, settlement code and telephone number are separated by spaces
(044) 123 4567	E.123, national format: long-distance prefix and city code in parentheses (national format: long-distance prefix and settlement code in parentheses due to possible confusion needs constant additional clarification), п. 2.8 ), the phone number is separated from the code and separated by spaces
+380 (44) 1234567	Microsoft, international format: country code, space code, settlement code in brackets, space code, telephone number.

=== United Kingdom ===
Dialling codes, also known as "area codes" are optional for local callers (often surrounded by parentheses, or separated with a dash), though there are trials running to make them mandatory, and are followed by the customer's telephone number.

Codes with the form 02x are followed by 8-digit local numbers and are usually written as 02x AAAA AAAA or (02x) AAAA AAAA. Area codes with the form 011x or 01x1 are used for many of the major population centres in the UK, are always followed by 7-digit local numbers and are usually written as 01xx AAA BBBB, (01xx) AAA BBBB or 01x1-AAA BBBB (the latter formerly the recommended format for six major metropolitan areas in the UK). Other area codes have the form 01xxx with 5 or 6 figure local numbers written as 01xxx or (01xxx) followed by subscriber number AAAAA or AAAAAA; or have the form 01xx xx with 4 or 5 figure local numbers written as 01xx xx or (01xx xx) followed by subscriber number AAAA or AAAAA.

Numbers for mobile phones and pagers are formatted as 07AAA BBBBBB and most other non-geographic numbers are 10 figures in length (excluding trunk digit '0') and formatted as 0AAA BBB BBBB. However, these numbers are sometimes written in other formats. 9 figure freephone numbers are 0500 AAAAAA and 0800 AAAAAA and there is one number of 8 figures length: 0800 1111 (Childline).

Domestically, there are also a number of special service numbers such as 100 for the operator, 123 for the speaking clock and 155 for the international operator, as well as 118 AAA for various directory enquiry services, and 116 AAA for various helplines. For some services, the number you call will depend on which operator you use to connect the call. 112 and 999 work for calling the emergency services. These numbers cannot be called from abroad.

When calling from abroad, the initial '0' trunk prefix is not required; it is, however, commonplace to represent telephone numbers with both the international code and the '0' trunk prefix - which is typically placed within parentheses - but this representation is inconsistent with the E.123 international standard.

== North America ==
=== United States, Canada, and other NANP countries ===
Twenty-four countries and territories share the North American Numbering Plan (NANP), with a single country code, 1. The formatting convention for telephone numbers is (NPA) NXX-XXXX, where NPA is the three-digit area code, and NXX-XXXX is the seven-digit subscriber number. NPA has the same syntax of NXX since the implementation of interchangeable area codes in 1995. The prefix NXX of the subscriber number is the central office code, unique in the numbering plan area. The place holder N stands for the digits 2 to 9, as the subscriber number may not begin with the digits 0 and 1. It is a closed telephone numbering plan in which all subscriber telephone numbers have seven digits, in addition to the three-digit area code.

Under all-number calling, a numbering plan introduced around 1960, local calls within an area code were placed by dialing NXX-XXXX, omitting the area code, known as seven-digit dialing. Only calling a destination in a different area code required dialing the destination area code, known as ten-digit dialing. Due to the need for a larger telephone number pool in many regions, seven-digit dialing is becoming rare in the United States. With the rapid growth of telephony in the late 20th century, many metropolitan areas saw the introduction of additional area codes. Multiple area codes were assigned to the same numbering plan area, a configuration known as an overlay numbering plan. Calls within an overlay are still local calls, despite the need for ten-digit dialing.

With the creation of the single national number for suicide prevention, 988, 10-digit dialing became mandatory for all calls on the Public Switched Telephone Network in the United States in 2022 and Canada in 2023.

In general, placing long-distance calls requires dialing the trunk code 1, but this may be optional in some areas. Calls from cellular phones make the prefix digit "1" unnecessary, and is ignored if used.

=== Canada ===
Canada is a member of the North American Numbering Plan, but administers its numbering resources individually, under guidance from the NANP Administrator. The Canadian government has stated on its Language Portal of Canada that telephone numbers are to be written with a hyphen between each sequence, as follows: 1-NPA-NXX-XXXX or NPA-NXX-XXXX. 10-digit dialing is now required throughout most of Canada, including all of British Columbia, Alberta, Saskatchewan, Manitoba, Quebec, Nova Scotia, Prince Edward Island, Newfoundland and Labrador, and Ontario. CRTC policy 2022-234 established 10-digit dialing for Ontario's 807 area code, Newfoundland and Labrador, New Brunswick, and areas of Northwest Territories. Areas not yet requiring 10-digit dialing are Yukon, parts of Northwest Territories, and Nunavut, although 10-digit dialing may be accepted in some of these areas.

In the province of Québec, where French is the first language, the Office québécois de la langue française has established that telephone numbers must be written with spaces first and then a hyphen for the last sequence, as follows: 1 NPA NXX-XXXX.

=== Mexico ===
Mexican telephone numbers have ten digits. They can consist of a two-digit (NN) area code and an eight-digit local number (ABCD XXXX) or a three-digit area code (NNN) with a seven-digit local number (ABC XXXX).

As of August 3, 2019 all the indicators and access codes (01, 044, 045) are deprecated, therefore all telephone numbers, for landline or mobile service, are dialed with ten digits.

The formatting convention of a telephone number is

- ABCD XXXX or NN ABCD XXXX or (NN) ABCD-XXXX
- ABC XX XX or NNN ABC XXXX or (NNN) ABC-XX-XX

The country code for Mexico is 52. When dialing a number it must be formatted as "plus sign + country code + 10-digit number" e.g.: +52 NNN ABC XXXX

== Central America ==
Some Central American countries write the country code for their own and other Central American countries in parentheses, instead of using a + sign, as recommended by E.123. For example, for a number in Costa Rica they would write (506) 2222-2222 instead of +506 2222-2222. On the other hand, Guatemala does have the custom of using the + sign. It is quite common for Central American businesses to write the whole phone number, including the country code in parentheses, on business cards, signs, stationery, etc.

=== Costa Rica ===
Costa Rican telephone numbers have eight digits, and are usually written in the format 2NNN-NNNN (for landlines), 8NNN-NNNN (for mobile telephone numbers from local telephone company ICE), 6NNN-NNNN (for mobile telephone numbers from Movistar) and 7NNN-NNNN (for mobile phone numbers from Claro). Toll-free numbers use the format 800-NNN-NNNN and premium-rate telephone numbers are written 90x-NNN-NNNN where x varies according to the type of service offered. There are also "short numbers" for emergencies such as 911.

When Costa Rica switched from 7- to 8-digit numbers, it used a scheme similar to the 8-digit number scheme already in place in El Salvador at that time.

=== El Salvador ===
El Salvadoran telephone numbers have eight digits, usually written in the format 2NNN-NNNN (for landline use) and 7NNN-NNNN (for mobile telephone numbers). Premium-rate numbers start with a 9.

=== Guatemala ===
Guatemalan telephone numbers have eight digits and written in the format 2NNN-NNNN for landlines in Guatemala City, 6NNN-NNNN for landlines for the rest of municipalities in the Guatemala Department, and 7NNN-NNNN for landlines in Rural Guatemala / rest of country. Non-geographic numbers (mobile) are 5NNN-NNNN, 4NNN-NNNN, and 3NNN-NNNN. Within each area, there are different service providers. The following 3 digits indicate the service provider. However, their assignment is on a first-come first-served basis.

Additionally there are special numbers with the following conventions: 3 digit numbers for emergency systems, four digit numbers, 15NN for information and governmental institutions and 17NN for commercial and banking institutions with a high call influx, 6 digit numbers for Telephone carriers numbers and making operator assisted calls, collect calls. These calls are billed at different rates. 1-800: Toll-free calls redirected to out of country offices and 1-801: Local toll-free calls.

=== Honduras ===
Honduran telephone numbers have either seven digits (for landlines), which are usually written NNN-NNNN, or eight digits (for mobile numbers), which are written NNNN-NNNN. The fact that landline and mobile numbers are different lengths sometimes causes confusion.

In 2010, an additional digit (2) was added to the start of land line numbers, thus standardizing the length at eight digits.

== South America ==
=== Argentina ===
Argentine telephone numbers always consist of 11 digits, including the geographical area code.

==== Area code ====
The area code can have 3, 4 or 5 digits, the first being always 0 (indicative of long-distance calls). Moreover, in 1999 the whole country (except Buenos Aires, and Greater Buenos Aires) was divided into two zones. Roughly and with exceptions, one includes most of the northern half of the country; and the other, most of the southern half, though the actual reason for this division is not geographical, but the fact that each zone is administered by a different company.

So, the second digit of area codes can be 1 (only in Buenos Aires and Greater Buenos Aires code "011") or else a 2 (for towns in the southern half of the country) or a 3 (for the northern half). For example, (011) for Buenos Aires, (0341) for Rosario, (02627) for San Rafael. And the subscriber's number will accordingly have 6, 7 or 8 digits, to complete the eleven digits.

Phone numbers are mostly written as:

- (011) xxxx-xxxx (Note that only the (011) code has 3 digits),
- (0xxx) xxx-xxxx or
- (0xxxx) xx-xxxx

The area code is usually written between brackets.

==== Subscriber number ====
In 1999, a general reform was introduced to telephone numbers, including the 1, 2 and 3 for area codes as explained above, and adding a 4 at the beginning of all subscriber's numbers. However, since the reform some local numbers starting with a 5 are beginning to appear. Moreover, a hyphen is usually placed to separate the last four digits. Code areas do not usually include one single city or town, but several neighbouring towns. So, the part before the hyphen (called a prefix) is usually indicative of either a town within the code area, or even of a part of a larger city, which is assigned several prefixes. As a matter of fact, each area code has only a limited number of prefixes assigned, and these are locally limited within the area.

For example, the (0342) area has numbers with a 456- prefix, mostly located in the centre of Santa Fe. It also has numbers with a 460- prefix, usually for phone lines in the north east of the city. And there are lines with a 474- prefix, located in Santo Tomé. But no 444- prefix exists within this area. As for the part after the hyphen, it may usually be any succession of four digits, though sometimes a prefix is shared by two or more small towns, and then, the first digit after the hyphen carries the distinction between towns.

Sometimes, a prefix is reserved for official numbers, that is for offices depending on the national, provincial or local state. In the (0342) area, this is 457-, and phones within this prefix communicate with each other, by simply dialing the four final digits, though from other phones the prefix must be dialled as well.

==== Mobile phones ====
Mobile phones use the same area codes as landline telephones, but the number begins with a "15", added to a string of 6, 7 or 8 digits, just as described above. After the "15", the remainder of the number can start with a 3, a 4, a 5 or a 6. This "15" may be dropped when a call is made to a mobile phone in a different code area. And when sending text messages, the receiver's number is best dialled both without the "15" and with the long-distance code, even if both sender and receiver share a code area, but without the initial "0".

To sum up, given the mobile phone (011) 154-123-4567, you will call it by dialing:

- 154-123-4567 (within the same code area),
- (011) [15]4-123-4567 (from a different code area, including or omitting the 15),

And you will send messages to:

- 11 4-123-4567 (even when your phone has also a 011 number).

==== Special numbers ====
Two sorts of special numbers exist in Argentina. On the one hand, three-digit numbers are used for special services such as to call the police, fire brigade or emergency doctors, as well as to hear the official time. Also telephone companies have three-digit numbers to report a problem in the lines, or to ask for another subscriber's number, when a paper directory is not available.

Additionally, there are other longer numbers. These include (but are not limited to):

- 0800 xxx abcd
- 0810 xxx abcd
- 0600 xxx abcd

(where the xxx indicates the same digit dialled three times, and a, b, c and d may each be any of the ten digits)

0800 lines are used by companies, and it is the receiver and not the caller who pays for the call, so that potential clients are encouraged to contact business companies for free.

0810 lines are paid by the caller, but the cost is for a local call, even if you are calling from a different area. The remaining is covered by the receiver.

And 0600 numbers are special more expensive lines, that serve such purposes as TV games, fund collecting for charity companies, hot lines, etc. Basically a part of the extra money charged to the caller is sent to the owner of the line.

Often the abcd or even (xx)xabcd part of the number is chosen, if available, to form a word that is representative of the company holding the number.

=== Brazil ===
Brazil is divided into 67 two-digit geographical area codes, all of which with eight-digit numbers, in the format AA NNNN-NNNN, except for cell phones, which contain nine digits, usually in the format AA 9NNNN-NNNN.

=== Peru ===
Peru uses 2-digit area codes followed by 6-digit subscriber numbers outside of Lima. In Lima the area code is "1" and the subscriber number has seven digits, divided XXX XXXX. The "trunk 0" is often used, especially for numbers outside Lima. For example, a phone number in Arequipa might be written (054) XX-XXXX.

Cellphone numbers used to have eight digits with the first digit always being 9. In 2008 an additional digit was added to cellphone numbers, while land numbers remained the same. The previous convention for cell numbers in Lima was usually 9XXX XXXX, though 9-XXX XXXX was also used. With the new 9-digit number, the form 9XX XXX XXX is becoming increasingly common as opposed to 9 XXXX XXXX, 9X XXX XXXX or 9XXXX XXXX.

Outside Lima cellphone numbers used to be 9 followed by six digits, i.e., 9 XXX XXX. The 2008 changes were somewhat more complicated. In four departments (similar to states), a 2 digit code now has to be entered before the 9. In the example of Arequipa, the code of 95 has to be entered before the 9, so the new numeration is 959 XXX XXX. The other codes are 94 for La Libertad (Trujillo), 96 for Piura and 97 for Lambayeque (Chiclayo). In the other 19 rural departments, the 9 is followed by the department's 2-digit area code then the 6-digit subscriber number. For example, the area code for Cusco is 84, so their new cellphone numeration is 984 XXX XXX. The effect is that all Peruvian cellphone numbers now have nine digits; under the old system they had eight digits in Lima and 7 everywhere else.

== See also ==
- List of international call prefixes
- List of telephone country codes
- Long distance calling
- Short code
