= International Networks (country code) =

+882 and +883, non-country-specific calling codes

International Networks is the name assigned by the International Telecommunication Union (ITU) to country calling codes +882 and +883, serving as non-geographic numbers for global telecommunication platforms, satellite systems, maritime/aeronautical roaming, and international Internet of Things (IoT) and Machine-to-Machine (M2M) networks.

Satellite telephone carriers operating worldwide mobile satellite systems are primarily allocated within the Global Mobile Satellite System (GMSS) country code +881, with the exception of Inmarsat, which utilizes country code +870.

== Structure ==
As with other ITU shared country codes, carriers are allocated number space within these country codes combined with an assigned Network Identification Code (IC):

- +882 code space: Uses a two-digit Identification Code following the country code (e.g., +882 16).
- +883 code space: Uses a three-digit or four-digit Identification Code following the country code (e.g., +883 260 or +883 5120).

Subscriber numbers follow the format of +882 or +883, followed by the carrier's Identification Code and the subscriber or device identifier.

== Carrier assignments ==
=== Active +882 assignments ===
Code	Operator / Applicant	Network / Service
+882 10	British Telecommunications plc	Global Office Application
+882 16	Thuraya	Thuraya RMSS Network
+882 23	SITA-Equant Joint Venture	Sita-Equant Network
+882 28	Deutsche Telekom AG	Next Generation Network
+882 31	Telekom Malaysia	Global International ATM Network
+882 32	Telenor (for Maritime Communications Partner A.S.)	MCP Maritime Network
+882 35	Cisco Systems	Cisco Systems Network
+882 36	Jersey Telecom	Jersey Telecom Network
+882 37	Wireless Maritime Services, LLC	Wireless Maritime Services
+882 39	Vodafone Group	Vodafone Ireland International Network
+882 45	Telecom Italia	Telecom Italia Global Network
+882 46	Tyntec Limited	Tyntec Global SMS/Data Network
+882 47	TRANSATEL	Transatel Cellular MVNO/IoT Platform
+882 48	Sawatch Limited	EchoStar Mobile Limited
+882 50	Phonegroup SA	Phonegroup Platform
+882 52	China Telecommunications Corporation	China Telecom International Network
+882 99	AeroMobile AS	AeroMobile In-Flight Cellular Network

=== Active +883 assignments ===
Code	Operator / Applicant	Network / Service
+883 110	Syniverse Technologies, LLC	Syniverse Global Messaging/Data Network
+883 130	Orange	Orange Global Network
+883 150	One Network B.V.	One Network IoT Connectivity
+883 170	EMnify GmbH	EMnify Mobile IoT Platform
+883 180	Bondio Limited	Bondio Network
+883 190	Com4 Sweden AB	Com4 M2M/IoT Network
+883 200	Manx Telecom Trading Ltd.	Manx Telecom Global IoT
+883 210	Telecom26 AG	Telecom26 Global Connectivity
+883 240	BICS SA	BICS International Network
+883 250	Bird B.V. (formerly MessageBird B.V.)	MessageBird Platform
+883 260	KORE Wireless (formerly Twilio Inc.)	KORE Wireless IoT Network
+883 270	Onomondo ApS	Onomondo Network
+883 290	Limitless Mobile, LLC	Limitless Mobile
+883 300	1NCE GmbH	1NCE IoT Connectivity Platform
+883 330	Cubic Telecom Limited	Cubic Telecom Automotive/IoT Network
+883 340	Giesecke+Devrient Mobile Security	Podsystem/G+D IoT Platform
+883 360	Telecom Italia Sparkle S.p.A.	Sparkle IoT Network
+883 370	A1 Telekom Austria AG	A1 IoT Connectivity
+883 380	Eseye Limited	Eseye AnyNet IoT Platform
+883 390	Airnity SAS	Airnity Automotive Connectivity
+883 400	Telefónica Móviles España, S.A.	Telefónica Spain Global IoT
+883 410	Telefónica Germany GmbH & Co. OHG	Telefónica Germany IoT
+883 420	Mobile Telecommunications Company K.S.C.P.	Zain Bahrain M2M Platform
+883 430	BJT PARTNERS SAS	BJT Partners Network
+883 460	KORE Wireless	KORE Wireless International M2M Network
+883 470	Webbing	Webbing eSIM / IoT Platform
+883 480	BBIX Singapore Pte. Ltd.	BBIX Network
+883 500	Lynk Global, Inc.	Lynk Direct-to-Cell Satellite Network
+883 5120	MTX Connect Ltd	MTX Connect International Network

=== Returned or reclaimed assignments ===
The following identification codes were previously assigned by the ITU-T but have since been reclaimed or returned (designated as "Code Returned - Spare" in the ITU database):

Code	Former Operator	Original Network Designation
+882 11	Singapore Technologies Telecommunications	Asia Pacific Mobile Telecommunications (APMT)
+882 12	Verizon (MCI)	HyperStream International (HSI) Data Network
+882 13	Telespazio S.p.A.	EMS Regional Mobile Satellite System
+882 14	Verizon	Global ATM Network
+882 15	Telstra (REACH)	Global International ATM Network
+882 17	AT&T	AT&T International ATM Network
+882 18	Teledesic	Teledesic Global Network
+882 19	Telecom Italia	Telecom Italia Global Network
+882 20	Asia Cellular Satellite	Garuda Mobile Telecommunication Satellite System
+882 21	Ameritech	Gateway Global Service Network
+882 22	Cable & Wireless plc	Cable & Wireless Global Network
+882 24	TeliaSonera AB	TeliaSonera Multinational ATM Network
+882 25	Constellation Communications	Constellation Satellite System
+882 26	SBC Communications	Global Data Network
+882 27	Williams Communications Inc.	Williams Communications Network
+882 29	Q-Tel (NZ) Ltd	SkyMessenger International
+882 30	Singapore Telecom	Global Reach Network
+882 33	Oration Technologies Inc.	Oration Technologies Network
+882 34	BebbiCell AG	Global Networks Switzerland
+882 38	Ellipso	Ellipso Satellite System
+882 40	Oy Cubio Communications	Oy Communications
+882 41	Intermatica	Intermatica Network
+882 42	Wins Limited / Seanet	Seanet Maritime Communications AB
+882 43	Ukrainian Radiosystems	Beeline Network
+882 44	In & Phone	Ship GSM Network
+882 49	Monaco Telecom	Monaco Telecom Global
+882 51	Athalos Global Services BV	Athalos Global Network
+882 97	Smart Communications	Smart Communications Network
+882 98	SITA (OnAir N.V.)	OnAir GSM Aeronautical Network
+883 100	MediaLincc Ltd	MediaLincc Network
+883 120	Telenor Connexion AB	Telenor Connexion M2M
+883 140	MTT	Multiregional TransitTelecom Network
+883 160	IMC Island Ehf	DCN Hub ehf
+883 220	Beezz Communication Solutions Ltd.	Beezz IoT Platform
+883 230	SAP	SAP Enterprise IoT Network
+883 280	Plintron	Plintron Global Technology Solutions
+883 310	Clementvale Baltic OÜ	Clementvale Network
+883 320	Tele2 Sverige Aktiebolag	Tele2 IoT Network
+883 350	Afinna One Srl	Afinna One Network
+883 440	Truphone Limited	Truphone Global Network
+883 450	HMD Global Oy	HMD Global Connectivity
+883 490	Datora Mobile Telecomunicações SA	Datora Network
+883 5100	Voxbone	iNum Initiative (Decommissioned)
+883 5110	Bandwidth.com Inc	Bandwidth Network
+883 5130	SIPME Ltd	SIPME Network
+883 5140	Ellipsat Inc	Ellipsat Network
