= Dial plan =

In telecommunication, a dial plan (or dialing plan) establishes the permitted sequences of digits dialed by telephone subscriber and the manner in which a telephone switch interprets these digits within the definitions of the prevailing telephone numbering plan. Dial plans in the public switched telephone network referred to as dialing procedures.

The collection of permissible digit patterns, so called digit-maps, for a private telephone system or for customer premise equipment, such as an analog telephone adapter (ATA) or an IP phone, is sometimes also called dial plan. A pattern may be as short as a single digit, e.g. for reaching an operator, or as long as a complete international telephone number, including trunk prefixes and international prefixes.

== Public switched telephone network (US) ==
- Local numbers consist of seven digits within a numbering plan area with a single area code. For overlay numbering plans the area code must be dialed before the local telephone number.
- Long distance dialing requires the dialing of 1, the three-digit area code, and the seven-digit local number.
- International numbers of any length are dialed starting with 011.

Similarly, telephony service operators may provide dialing sequences for special services, such as directory assistance and emergency services.

== Private telephone systems ==
PBX equipment, carrier switching systems, and end-user telephones may use variable-length or fixed-length dial plans. In private branch exchanges in the U.S. a dialing plan may specify the addresses of internal extensions, typically as numbers of two, three, or four digits.

Dialing from a PBX telephone is usually by default to internal numbers, i.e. for calls within the PBX, so that reaching PSTN numbers often requires dialing a special prefix, e.g. a 9, before the PSTN number.

== Digit maps ==
Analog telephone adapters, IP phones, and many other VoIP media gateways have configuration options that establish the digit sequences that can be dialed with the equipment. The dial plan of these devices is established by a digit map. The following syntax may be used for such dial plan, as adapted from RFC 2705, the specification for the Media Gateway Control Protocol.

Dial Plan Syntax
To specify a	Enter the following	Result
Digit	0 1 2 3 4 5 6 7 8 9 *	Identifies a specific digit (do not use #)
Range	[digit-digit]	Identifies any digit dialed that is included in the range
Range	[digit-digit, digit]	Specifies a range as a comma separated list
Wild card	x	x matches any single digit that is dialed
Wild card	.	. matches an arbitrary number of digits
Timer	T	Indicates that an additional time out period of 4 seconds should take place before automatic dialing starts

Some dial plan examples using the above syntax look as follows:

Dial Plan Syntax Examples
For calls to	Users dial	Dial plan
Internal Extension	a two digit number	xx
Local Number	9 (if required for an outside line) and then a seven digit number	9xxxxxxxT
Emergency	911	911
Local Operators	9 (if required for an outside line) then 0	90T
Long Distance	9 (if required), 1, area code and local number	91xxxxxxxxxx
International	9 (if required), 011, any number of additional digits	9011x.T
