= In Case of Emergency =

Storing phone numbers for relatives

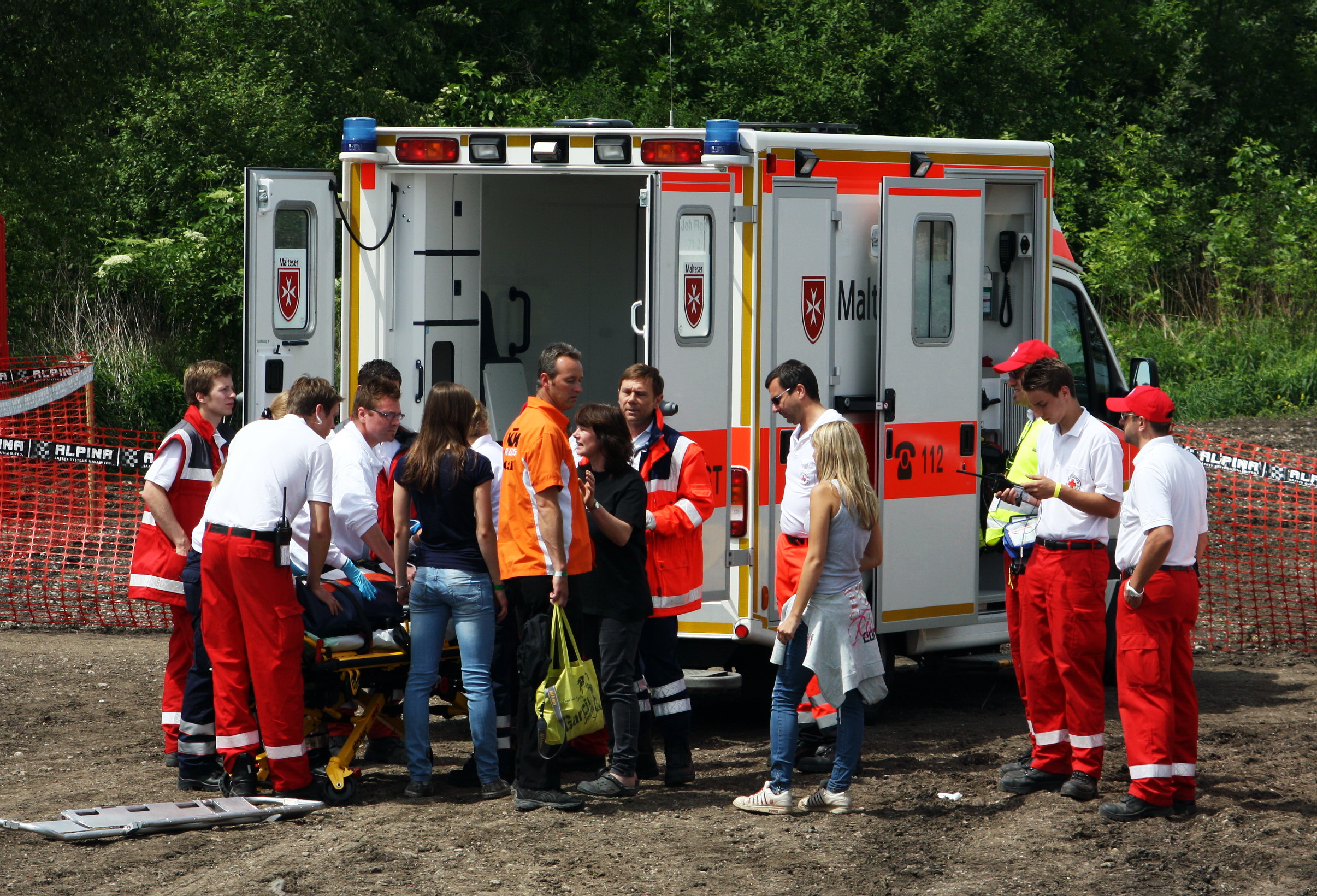
An emergency vehicle loading up an injured motocross rider

In Case of Emergency (ICE) is a programme designed to enable first responders, such as paramedics, firefighters, and police officers, as well as hospital personnel, to contact the next of kin of the owner of a mobile phone in order to obtain important medical or support information (the mobile phone must be unlocked and working). The phone entry (or entries) should supplement or complement written (such as wallet, bracelet, or necklace) information or indicators. The programme was conceived in the mid-2000s and promoted by British paramedic Bob Brotchie in May 2005. It encourages people to enter emergency contacts in their mobile phone address book under the name 'ICE'. Alternatively, a person can list multiple emergency contacts as 'ICE1', 'ICE2', etc.

The programme has been criticised by some emergency responders, and the HoaxBuster site.

== Overview ==
Following research carried out by Vodafone that showed that fewer than 25% of people carry any details of who they would like to be telephoned following a serious accident, a campaign encouraging people to do this was started in May 2005 by Bob Brotchie of the East of England Ambulance Service in the United Kingdom. The idea has taken off since the 7 July 2005 London bombings.

When interviewed on the BBC Radio 4 Today programme on 12 July 2005, Brotchie said:

"I was reflecting on some difficult calls I've attended, where people were unable to speak to me through injury or illness and we were unable to find out who they were. I discovered that many people, obviously, carry mobile phones and we were using them to discover who they were. It occurred to me that if we had a uniform approach to searching inside a mobile phone for an emergency contact then that would make it easier for everyone."

Brotchie also urged mobile phone manufacturers to support the campaign by adding an ICE heading to the contact list of all new mobile phones.

With this additional information and medical information, first responders can access this information from the victim's phone in the event of an emergency. In the event of major trauma, it is critical to have this information within the golden hour, which can increase the chances of survival.

== Criticism ==
While some emergency responders lauded the suggestion, others have criticised it.

In Germany, the In Case of Emergency concept has been criticised for two reasons:

- Medical service personnel on site normally do not have the time to contact relatives. Information stored on a phone is thus useless for medical care prior to hospital.
- Contacting relatives of a seriously injured person is a sensitive task that is not carried out by telephone in the first place.

Other problems include language-dependent text (ICE in English, ECU in French, etc.), the difficulty of accessing locked, discharged, or broken phones, differences among mobile models requiring training of emergency responders.

The French HoaxBuster site was critical of ICE from a francophone point of view and recommended that one carries contact information and relevant medical information in writing inside one's wallet, and not rely on ICE contacts as a primary means of identification.

Many smartphone models have dedicated ICE contact information functionality either built into the operating system, or available as an app. Saving duplicate phone numbers on a phone without dedicated ICE functionality may cause the ICE and regular contacts to be combined, or cause the caller ID to fail for incoming calls from a close friend or relative. (To avoid this, some use the tel: URI scheme to put the phone number in the ICE contact's 'home page' field.)

An alternate proposal was made within the ITU-T standard E.123 which recommended prefixing emergency contact names with numerals beginning with 0.

== Locked phones ==
For security purposes, many mobile phone owners now lock their mobiles, requiring a passcode or PIN to be entered in order to access the device. This hinders the ability of first responders to access the ICE phone list entry. In response to this problem, many device manufacturers have provided a mechanism to specify some text to be displayed while the mobile is in the locked state. The owner of the phone can specify their 'In Case of Emergency' contact, and also a 'Lost and Found' contact. Android users running Android Nougat (Android 7.0) or higher also have the ability to store emergency information and contact details accessible by others through the emergency call screen when the device is locked. Emergency contacts can be added to iPhone lock screens with the iOS Health application, and accessed by tapping or swiping to the Emergency dialler, where calls to 911 or another pre-specified number can be made, and the Medical ID button is displayed as well. When accessing this Medical ID, the user's name, health information, allergies and medications can be listed, along with the ability to directly contact listed emergency contacts.

Alternatively, some handsets provide access to a list of ICE contacts directly from the lock screen. There are also smartphone 'apps' (applications) that allow custom ICE and emergency information to be displayed on the 'locked' screen.

== Popularity ==
The popularity of the programme is difficult to assess. A CNN article mentioned that the programme might be spreading into North America, but gave different instructions to its readers.

== See also ==
- E.123 — a language-independent version of ICE
- Medical identification tag
- Orsec plan
- Vial of Life
