= E.123 =

ITU-T Recommendation

- Notation for national and international telephone numbers, e-mail addresses and Web addresses
- Status: In force
- Latest version: (02/01); February 2001
- Organization: ITU-T
- Related standards: E.163, E.164
- Domain: telephony
- License: Freely available
- Website: https://www.itu.int/rec/T-REC-E.123

E.123 is an international standard by the Telecommunication Standardization Sector of the International Telecommunication Union (ITU-T), entitled Notation for national and international telephone numbers, e-mail addresses and Web addresses. It provides guidelines for the presentation of telephone numbers, email addresses, and web addresses in print, on letterheads, and similar purposes.

As described by the standard, ⟨+⟩ is the international prefix symbol, should precede the country code, and serves to identify the number following as the international telephone number.

== Example formats ==
Telephone number, national notation (full number dialing)	(0607) 123 4567
Telephone number, E.123 international notation	+22 607 123 4567
Email address	example@example.com
Domain name / Web	www.example.com

== Telephone number ==
In the international telephone number notation, the leading plus (+) serves as an international prefix symbol, and is immediately followed by the country code. The user or the telephone system should replace the + symbol with international dialing prefix used in the caller's location.

Parentheses are used in national notation to indicate digits that are sometimes not dialed, such as area code in variable-length dialing numbering plans. Parentheses are not allowed in the international notation, according to the standard, as international callers use fixed number dialing.

For digit grouping, E.123 specifically recommends that:

- only spaces be used to visually separate groups of numbers "unless an agreed upon explicit symbol (e.g. hyphen) is necessary for procedural purposes" in national notation;
- only spaces should be used to visually separate groups of numbers in international notation;
- spaces should separate country code, area code and local number.

No recommendation is made for grouping rules for digits in the local number, instead some examples of commonly used groupings are shown.

In national notation, the trunk prefix can be included with the area code if required by national writing conventions; trunk prefix is included in most European countries whenever they use fixed or variable dialing, but is omitted in USA and Canada where phone numbers only indicate optional area code.

A tilde (~) indicates an additional dial tone that the user should wait for.

A slash (/) with spaces on either side may be used to indicate alternative ending for numbers (i.e. "555 1234 / 4444" means 555 1234 and 555 4444).

The non-dialable PBX (private branch exchange) extension number should be separated by words "extension" or "ext." in the national language after the phone number.

When the PBX is capable of direct inward dialing, the extension number should be written directly after the phone number, without using any distinct symbols. If there is a need to indicate in-dialing capability of the telephone number, a number of dots (....) corresponding to the length of the extension number can be added at the end.

=== Microsoft telephone number format ===
Microsoft canonical address format for telephone numbers derives from E.123 international notation by allowing explicit indication of area code with parentheses.

The canonical format is used by the Telephony API (TAPI), a Windows programming interface for dial-up fax, modem, and telephone equipment. Depending on the user's current location, the Windows' Dial-Up Networking (DUN) component applies a set of dialing rules to transform the canonical phone number into a locally dialable calling sequence for the modem device. The dialing rules may include variable-length dialing for area code, trunk access and international access prefixes, central office/service access numbers, and calling cards tone numbers.

With this approach, phone numbers stored in the phone book remain unchanged when the user moves to a different geographical location or selects a different phone service provider.

The calling sequence can contain dialable numbers such as digits 0–9 and DTMF tones ABCD*#, formatting characters ␣ . -, and control characters ! P T , W @ $ ? ;, which correspond to the Dial command of the Hayes AT command set.

== Emergency contact information ==
A standardized language-independent way to identify a next-of-kin (or other emergency contact) in a mobile handset’s directory, in case of an emergency, has in May 2008 been adopted as a new clause in Recommendation E.123.

It proposes to store emergency contact numbers prefixed with Arabic numerals in the form “0nxxxx”; “n” is a digit from 1 through 9 and “xxxx” is any meaningful descriptive character string in any language or script (e.g. “Anna” or “Spouse”).

In the handset's directory this would be displayed as "01Anna" or "01Spouse" enabling easy identification by the emergency services. The handset’s directory entry (in the “contact number” field) would contain the actual number of the person to call in case of emergency.

This language-independent recommendation preceded the popular "ICE" (In Case of Emergency) scheme introduced in 2005 to the English-speaking world.

== See also ==
- National conventions for writing telephone numbers
- E.164
- List of country calling codes
