= Truth in Caller ID Act of 2009 =

US legislation regarding caller ID spoofing

The Truth in Caller ID Act of 2009 is an Act of the United States Congress that generally makes it illegal to use false Caller ID information for a call with the intent to defraud or scam a called party. The Act makes exceptions for certain law-enforcement purposes. Callers are also still allowed to preserve their anonymity by choosing to block all outgoing caller ID information on their phone lines. Caller ID spoofing is generally illegal in the United States if done "with the intent to defraud, cause harm, or wrongfully obtain anything of value".

Under the act, which also targets caller ID spoofing on VOIP services, it is illegal "to cause any caller identification service to knowingly transmit misleading or inaccurate caller identification information with the intent to defraud, cause harm, or wrongfully obtain anything of value...." Forfeiture penalties or criminal fines of up to $10,000 per violation (not to exceed $1,000,000) could be imposed. The law maintains an exemption for blocking one's own outgoing caller ID information, and the government itself isn't affected.

== History ==
On April 6, 2006, Congressmen Eliot Engel (D-N.Y.) and Joe Barton (R-Tex.) introduced H.R. 5126, a bill that would have made caller ID spoofing a crime. Dubbed the "Truth in Caller ID Act of 2006", the bill would have outlawed causing "any caller identification service to transmit misleading or inaccurate caller identification information" via "any telecommunications service or IP-enabled voice service." Law enforcement was exempted from the rule. Three weeks later, an identical bill was introduced in the Senate. On June 6, 2006, the House of Representatives passed the Truth in Caller ID Act, although no Senate action was taken on either the House or Senate bill. At the end of the 109th Congress, the bill expired (all pending legislation not voted into law at the end of the House term, a.k.a. end of a session of Congress, is dead).

On January 5, 2007, Congressman Engel introduced H.R. 251, and Senator Bill Nelson (D-Fla.) introduced a similar bill (S.704) two months later. On June 27, 2007, the United States Senate Committee on Commerce, Science and Transportation approved and submitted to the Senate calendar S.704, a bill that would have made caller ID spoofing a crime. Dubbed the "Truth in Caller ID Act of 2007", the bill would have outlawed causing "any caller identification service to transmit misleading or inaccurate caller identification information" via "any telecommunications service or IP-enabled voice service." Law enforcement was exempted from the rule. Engel's bill passed in the House of Representatives. Engel's bill was referred to the same Senate committee that approved S.704. The Senate again passed neither version of the legislation.

In the 111th Congress, Congressman Engel and Senator Nelson once again introduced similar versions of the Caller ID legislation, H.R. 1258. The bill was reintroduced in the Senate on January 7, 2009, as S.30, the Truth in Caller ID Act of 2009, and referred to the same committee. The Senate and the House both passed their respective versions of the legislation, but on December 15, 2010, the House passed S.30 and sent the legislation to the President for a signature. On December 22, 2010, President Obama signed the bill into law.

== Notable applications ==
The New York Times sent the number 111-111-1111 for all calls made from its offices until 15 August 2011. The fake number was intended to prevent the extensions of its reporters appearing in call logs, and thus protect reporters from having to divulge calls made to anonymous sources. The Times abandoned this practice because of the proposed changes to the caller ID law, and because many companies were blocking calls from the well-known number.

In November 2020, Kenneth Moser and his company, Marketing Support Systems, was fined $10 million for sending out 47,610 unlawful robocalls on May 30 and May 31, 2020. The calls attempted to discredit California State Assembly candidate Philip Graham by planting a story Graham attempted to grope and kiss a woman in a bar. A San Diego County Sheriff's Department investigation concluded that the allegations were false. The FCC said Moser violated the federal Truth in Caller ID Act by manipulating caller ID information to make it appear the recorded calls were coming from another firm called HomeyTel.
