= European Telephony Numbering Space =

Country calling code for multinational services in Europe

With the intent of forming a trans-Europe numbering plan as an option (or then future movement) for anyone needing multi-national European telephone presence, the ITU allocated country calling code +388 as a subdivided, catch-all container for such services. This was designated the European Telephony Numbering Space or ETNS.

Although some ETNS numbers were assigned, few phone companies supported connecting calls to ETNS.

Because of limited support, ETNS was suspended in 2005 and abolished in 2008. All ETS numbers were cancelled by the beginning of 2010. The +388 code was scheduled to be reclaimed by the ITU at the end of 2010; as of late 2011 it was listed by ITU as "Group of countries, shared code".

See also list of country calling codes.

== Allocation area ==
Geographically the +388 "country" code was an overlay on top of all the pre-existing, state-bounded country codes of the countries in Europe. Among "special" country codes, +388 was unique in that it was both supranational yet geographically bounded (other special codes, such as +881 and freephone +800, are completely international).

Instead of being subdivided geographically as in a typical numbering plan, the ETNS was intended to be subdivided by type of service or customer. It would therefore not have been possible to reverse engineer the location of an owner of an ETNS number based on the characteristics of the phone number. The numbers were also not allocated in blocks to individual carrier companies and were therefore intended to be portable. Carriers needed to have ETNS translation capability, or routing agreement with a carrier that did, in order for its customers to successfully call ETNS numbers.

== Subdivision ==
=== Country Groups ===
Specifically, ETNS was intended to be only one of a potentially larger set of European "country groups" participating in a shared regional overlay numbering plan. The only country group that comprised the ETNS was given an identification code of 3, which came after the +388 country code.

=== Services ===
After the country group identification code, the number space was divided according to service, indicated by a European Service Identity code. The table lists the service designations (country code, identification code, and ESI code) available under ETNS:

==== European Service Identity codes ====
- Public service application: 3883 1
- Customer service application: 3883 3
- Corporate networks: 3883 5
- Personal numbering: 3883 7

== See also ==
- Telephone numbers in Europe
