= Carrier of record =

A carrier of record (or COR) for telecommunications, refers to the entity that provides public switched telephone network (PSTN) service for an E.164 number. The exact definition of who and what a COR is, is ultimately the responsibility of the relevant national regulatory authority.

== See also ==
- Outline of telecommunication
