= E.164 =

ITU-T Recommendation for telephone numbering

Recommendation ITU-T E.164
- The international public telecommunication numbering plan
- Status: In force
- Year started: 1984
- Latest version: (06/20); June 2020
- Organization: ITU-T
- Committee: Study Group 2
- Related standards: E.123, E.163
- Domain: telephony
- Website: https://www.itu.int/rec/T-REC-E.164/

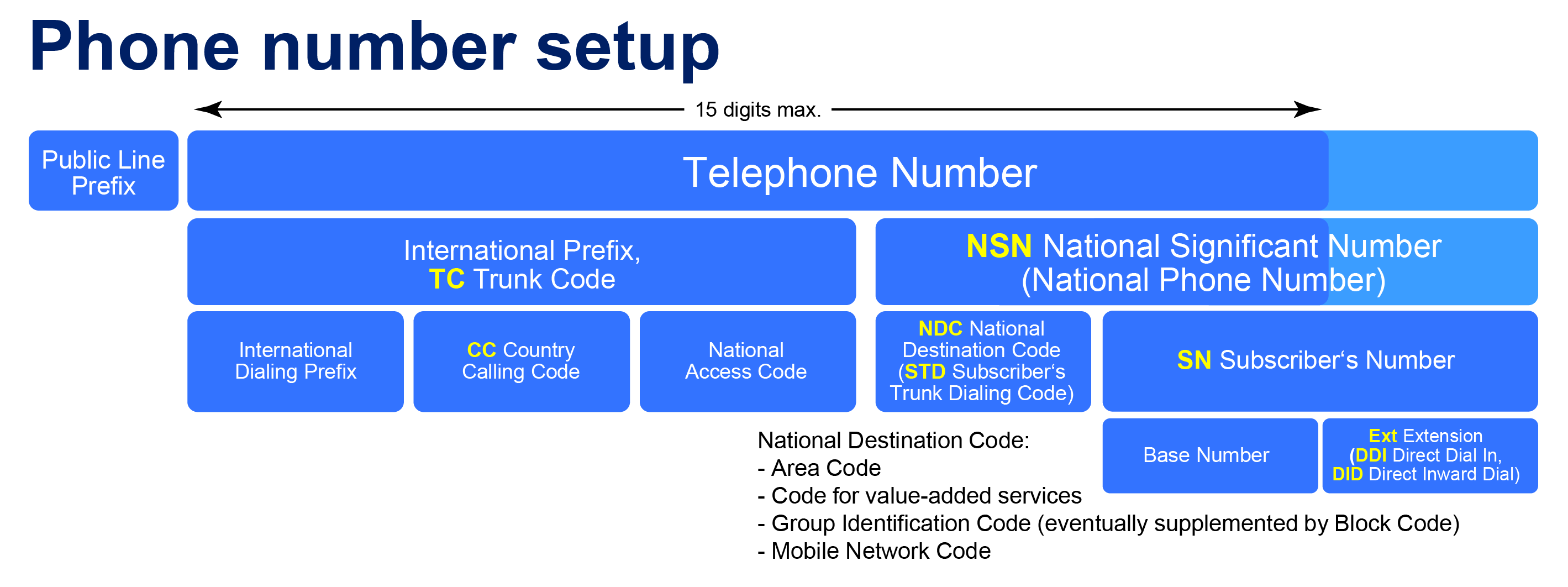

E.164 is an international standard (ITU-T Recommendation), titled The international public telecommunication numbering plan, that defines a numbering plan for the worldwide public switched telephone network (PSTN) and some other data networks.

E.164 defines a general format for international telephone numbers. Plan-conforming telephone numbers are limited to only digits and to a maximum of fifteen digits. The specification divides the digit string into a country code of one to three digits, and the subscriber telephone number of a maximum of twelve to fourteen digits. For global services, the country code has always three digits and the subscriber number a maximum of twelve digits.

== History ==
Recommendation E.164 is part of a series of standards (E.160–E.169, Numbering plan of the international telephone service) that represent a redefinition of the earlier specifications in Recommendation E.29 in the Red Books of 1960 and 1964. In 1960, an international numbering plan was defined for Europe and parts of western Asia, and some Mediterranean countries. In 1964, E.29 was expanded with a global code system based on world numbering zones. In the 1968 White Book, the definition of country codes was relegated to ITU Recommendation E.161. The first issue of E.164 was published in 1988 in Blue Book Fascicle II.2, under the title Numbering Plan for the ISDN Era.

== Recommendations ==
=== E.163 ===
E.163 was the former ITU-T recommendation for describing telephone numbers for the public switched telephone network (PSTN). In the United States, this was formerly referred to as a directory number. E.163 was withdrawn, and some recommendations were incorporated into revision 1 of E.164 in 1997.

=== E.164.1 ===
This recommendation describes the procedures and criteria for the reservation, assignment, and reclamation of E.164 country codes and associated identification code (IC) assignments. The criteria and procedures are provided as a basis for the effective and efficient utilization of the available E.164 numbering resources.

=== E.164.2 ===
This recommendation contains the criteria and procedures for an applicant to be temporarily assigned a three-digit identification code within the shared E.164 country code 991 for the purpose of conducting an international non-commercial trial.

=== E.164.3 ===
This recommendation describes the principles, criteria, and procedures for the assignment and reclamation of resources within a shared E.164 country code for groups of countries. These shared country codes will coexist with all other E.164-based country codes assigned by the ITU. The resource of the shared country code consists of a country code and a group identification code (CC + GIC) and provides the capability for a group of countries to provide telecommunication services within the group. The Secretariat of the ITU Standardization Sector (ITU-T), the Telecommunication Standardization Bureau (TSB) is responsible for the assignment of the CC + GIC.

== Numbering formats ==
The E.164 recommendation provides the telephone number structure and functionality for five categories of telephone numbers used in international public telecommunications.

For each of the categories, it details the components of the numbering structure and the digit analysis required for successful routing of calls. Annex A provides additional information on the structure and function of E.164 numbers. Annex B provides information on network identification, service parameters, calling/connected line identity, dialing procedures, and addressing for Geographic-based ISDN calls. Specific E.164-based applications which differ in usage are defined in separate recommendations.

The number categories are all based on a fifteen-digit numbering space. Before 1997, only twelve digits were allowed. The definition does not include any international call prefixes, necessary for a call to reach international circuits from inside the country of call origination.

=== Geographic areas ===
| Country Code | National Destination Code | Subscriber Number |
|---|---|---|
| 1 to 3 digits | maximum 15 digits − number of digits in the country code | |
maximum 15 digits

=== Global services ===
| Country Code | Global Subscriber Number |
|---|---|
| 3 digits | maximum 12 digits |
maximum 15 digits

Figure 2

=== Networks ===
| Country Code | Identification Code | Subscriber Number |
|---|---|---|
| 3 digits | 1 to 4 digits | maximum 12 digits − number of digits in the identification code |
maximum 15 digits

=== Groups of countries ===
| Country Code | Group Identification Code | Subscriber Number |
|---|---|---|
| 3 digits | 1 digit | maximum 11 digits |
maximum 15 digits

=== Trials ===
| Fixed code | Trial Identification Code | Subscriber Number |
|---|---|---|
| 991 | 1 digit | maximum 11 digits |
maximum 15 digits

== Uses of E.164 numbers ==
E.164 numbers were originally defined for use in the worldwide public switched telephone network (PSTN). The early PSTN collected routing digits from users (e.g., on a dial pad), signaled those digits to each telephony switch, and used the numbers to determine how to ultimately reach the called party.

ITU-T E.123 entitled Notation for national and international telephone numbers, e-mail addresses and web addresses provides guidance when printing E.164 telephone numbers. This format includes the recommendation of prefixing international telephone numbers with a plus sign (+) and using only spaces for digit grouping.

The presentation of a telephone number with the plus sign (+) indicates that the number should be dialed with an international calling prefix, in place of the plus sign. The number is presented starting with the telephone country code. This is called the globalized format of an E.164 number, and is defined in the Internet Engineering Task Force RFC 2806. The international calling prefix is a trunk code to reach an international circuit in the country of call origination.

=== DNS Mapping of E.164 numbers ===
Some national telephone administrations and telephone companies have implemented an Internet-based database for their numbering spaces. E.164 numbers may be registered in the Domain Name System (DNS) of the Internet in which the second-level domain e164.arpa has been reserved for telephone number mapping (ENUM). In the system, any telephone number may be mapped into a domain name using a reverse sequence of subdomains for each digit. For example, the telephone number +19995550123 translates to the domain name 3.2.1.0.5.5.5.9.9.9.1.e164.arpa. When a number is mapped, a DNS query may be used to locate the service facilities on the Internet that accept and process telephone calls to the owner of record of the number, using, for example, the Session Initiation Protocol (SIP), a call-signaling VoIP protocol whose SIP addresses are similar in format (user@domain...) to e-mail addresses. This allows a direct, end-to-end Internet connection without passing through the public switched telephone network.

== See also ==
- Carrier of record

== External sources ==
- ITU National Number Plans Reference
