= INum Initiative =

The iNum (international number) initiative was a project by Voxbone to create a global dial code for Voice over IP communications. Voxbone is a Belgian company specializing in wholesale telephone numbers for VoIP applications. The International Telecommunication Union (ITU) allocated a portion of the non-geographic "country code" +883 to this initiative. Specifically, iNums were telephone numbers in the format +883 5100 xxxxxxxx.

The system started operating in November 2008. Many providers offered iNum numbers and calls between them at no cost to their customers, but some charged for the service. Due to slow adoption, cost and compatibility issues, and the eventual lack of interest by Voxbone in maintaining the system, it was decommissioned in June 2020.

== Technical standards ==
The iNum networking was based on SIP standards and supported voice, video and SMS. Transcoding was available between G.711 and G.729. Video codecs supported were H.263+ and H.264, but theoretically any codec, including Skype's SILK and G.722, for high-definition voice, could be supported as long as the originating and terminating networks both supported it and transcoding was not required.

== Participating organizations and access ==
Voxbone provided free telephone number ranges to IP communications service providers, enterprises, NGOs and universities. Approximately 400 organizations were allocated iNum ranges. Popular VoIP providers offering iNum numbers to the general public included Callcentric, ippi, Localphone and VoIP.ms.

While +883 is a valid ITU dial code, not all telephone carriers could route the calls correctly. Skype, Belgacom, British Telecom, Colt, Google Voice, KPN, Orange Switzerland, Sprint USA and Verizon Europe were among the large communications companies that routed voice calls to iNum. SMS to iNum was supported by several agreements with international messaging providers.

It was also possible to call iNums through access numbers in many countries and cities, so callers could make local calls to iNum when their local carrier did not support routing. The caller would dial the local access number, then after the automated greeting dial the desired iNum.

In addition, iNums could be called through VoIP methods such as ENUM (RIPE e164.arpa) and SIP URI (format 8835100xxxxxxxx@sip.inum.net).

Country code +888 was allocated for the United Nations Office for the Coordination of Humanitarian Affairs (OCHA) international disaster response and implemented using the iNum platform.

== Cost ==
Voxbone offered free SIP termination to all service providers who offered it to their customers at or below the cost of a local call, leading many providers to offer the service at no cost. For example, Callcentric and ippi offered free iNum numbers and calls to any customer, and VoIP.ms offered them at no additional cost to existing customers.

Localphone initially offered free iNum numbers, later charging $0.25 per month from July 2018, but calls were always free. Google Voice began supporting calls to iNum in 2012, initially at no cost, but in 2013 it set a rate of $0.03 per minute.

== Later developments and decommissioning ==
After initial interest by many VoIP providers, adoption was slow. Most providers did not support iNum calls at all, and some of those that supported such calls charged for them, undermining the value of the project.

In later years the initiative began showing signs of abandonment. The iNum blog had no new posts after April 2015, and in July 2019 the whole iNum website was redirected to the Voxbone website, which no longer mentioned the project. Callcentric, one of the initial supporters, reluctantly discontinued its iNum service in November 2019 due to incompatibility after an equipment upgrade. In February 2020, Voxbone announced that it would decommission the system later that year, and the decommissioning was completed in June 2020.

Calls to iNum may still connect internally within the same provider, but not between providers.

== See also ==
- International Networks (country code)
