= Telephone numbering plan =

Numbering method for assigning routing addresses for telephones

A telephone numbering plan is a type of numbering scheme used in a telecommunications network to assign telephone numbers to subscriber telephones or other telephony endpoints. Telephone numbers are the addresses of participants in a telephone network, reachable by a system of destination code routing. Telephone numbering plans are defined world-wide, as well as within each of the administrative regions of the public switched telephone network (PSTN), and in private telephone networks.

In public numbering systems, geographic location typically plays a role in the sequence of numbers assigned to each telephone subscriber. Many numbering plan administrators subdivide their territory of service into geographic regions designated by a prefix, often called an area code or city code, which is a set of digits forming the most-significant part of the dialing sequence to reach a telephone subscriber. Within such regions designated by area codes, locally unique telephone numbers are assigned based on locally determined principles but in agreement with the larger-network rules.

Numbering plans may follow a variety of design strategies which have often arisen from the historical evolution of individual telephone networks and local requirements. A broad division is commonly recognized between closed and open numbering plans. A closed numbering plan, as found in North America, features fixed-length area codes and local numbers, while an open numbering plan has a variance in the length of the area code, local number, or both of a telephone number assigned to a subscriber line. The latter type developed predominantly in Europe.

The International Telecommunication Union (ITU) has established a comprehensive numbering plan, designated E.164, for uniform interoperability of the networks of its member state or regional administrations. It is an open numbering plan but imposes a maximum length of 15 digits to telephone numbers. The standard defines a country code for each member region which is prefixed to each national telephone number for international destination routing.

Private numbering plans exist in telephone networks that are privately operated in an enterprise or organizational campus. Such systems may be supported by a private branch exchange (PBX), which provides a central access point to the PSTN and also controls internal calls between telephone extensions.

In contrast to numbering plans which determine telephone numbers assigned to subscriber stations, dialing plans establish the customer dialing procedures, i.e., the sequence of digits or symbols to be dialed to reach a destination. It is the manner in which the numbering plan is used. Even in closed numbering plans, it is not always necessary to dial all digits of a number. For example, an area code may be omitted when the destination is in the same area as the calling station and the destination has only one area code.

== Telephone number structure ==
National or regional telecommunication administrations that are members of the International Telecommunication Union (ITU) use national telephone numbering plans that conform to international standard E.164.

E.164 specifies that a telephone number consists of a country code and a national telephone number. National telephone numbers are defined by national or regional numbering plans, such as the European Telephony Numbering Space, the North American Numbering Plan (NANP), or the UK number plan.

Within a national numbering plan, a complete destination telephone number is typically composed of an area code and a subscriber telephone number.

Many national numbering plans have developed from local historical requirements and progress or technological advancements, which resulted in a variety of structural characteristics of the numbers assigned to telephones. In the United States, the industry decided in 1947 to unite all local telephone networks under one common numbering plan with a fixed length of ten digits for the national telephone number of each telephone, of which the last seven digits were known as the local directory number, or subscriber number. Such a numbering plan became known as a closed numbering plan. In several European countries, a different strategy prevailed, known as the open numbering plan, which features a variance in the length of the area code, the local number, or both.

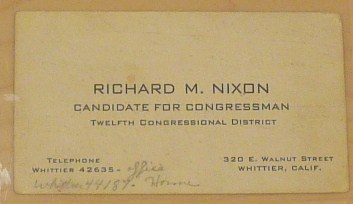
United States telephone numbers often included letter prefixes and telephone exchange names, which were more easily remembered by users than long digit sequences.

=== Subscriber number ===
The subscriber number is the address assigned to a telephone line or wireless communication channel terminating at the customer equipment. The first few digits of the subscriber number may indicate smaller geographical scopes, such as towns or districts, based on municipal aspects, or an individual telephone exchange (central office code), such as a wire center. In mobile networks they may indicate the network provider. Callers in a given area do not need to include area prefixes when dialing within the same area if the area has only one area code. Devices that dial telephone numbers automatically may include the full number with area and access codes.

The subscriber number is typically listed in local telephone directories, and is therefore often referred to as the directory number.

=== Area code ===
Telephone administrations that manage telecommunication infrastructure of extended size, such as a large country, often divide the territory into geographic areas. This benefits independent management by administrative or historical subdivisions, such as states and provinces, of the territory or country. Each area of subdivision is identified in the numbering plan with a routing code. This concept was first developed in the planning for a nationwide numbering plan for Operator Toll Dialing and Direct Distance Dialing (DDD) in the Bell System in the United States in the 1940s, a system that resulted in the North American Numbering Plan for World Zone 1. AT&T divided the United States and Canada into numbering plan areas (NPAs), and assigned to each NPA a unique three-digit prefix, the numbering plan area code, which became known in short-form as NPA code or simply area code. The area code is prefixed to each telephone number issued in its service area.

Other national telecommunication authorities use various formats and dialing rules for area codes. The size of area code prefixes may either be fixed or variable. Area codes in the NANP have three digits, while two digits are used in Brazil, and one digit is used in Australia and New Zealand. Variable-length formats exist in many countries, including Argentina, Austria, Germany, Japan, Mexico, and the United Kingdom.

In addition to digit count, the format may be restricted to certain digit patterns. For example, the NANP had at times specific restrictions on the range of digits for the three positions of the area code, and required assignment to geographical areas that avoided nearby areas receiving similar area codes, to avoid confusion and misdialing.

Some countries, such as Denmark and Uruguay, have merged variable-length area codes and telephone numbers into fixed-length numbers that must always be dialed regardless of location. In such administrations, the area code is not distinguished formally in the telephone number.

In the UK, area codes were first known as subscriber trunk dialling (STD) codes. Depending on local dialing plans, they are often necessary only when dialed from outside the code area or from mobile phones. In North America, ten-digit dialing is required in areas with overlay numbering plans, in which multiple area codes are assigned to the same area.

The strict correlation of a telephone number to a geographical area has been broken by technical advances, such as local number portability in the North American Numbering Plan and voice over IP services.

When dialing a telephone number, the area code may have to be preceded by a trunk prefix or national access code for domestic calls, and for international calls by the international access code and country code.

Area codes are often quoted by including the national access code. For example, a number in London may be listed as 020 7946 0321. Users must correctly interpret 020 as the code for London. If they call from another station within London, they may merely dial 7946 0321, or if dialing from another country, the initial 0 should be omitted after the country code.

== International numbering plan ==
Recommendation E.164 by the International Telecommunication Union establishes an international numbering plan for routing telephone calls between countries. It defines a unique telephone country code with for each member organization, unless they are participating in an integrated numbering plan with other countries. Country codes are dialing prefixes to national telephone numbers and direct call routing to the network of a subordinate numbering plan administration. E.164 permits a maximum length of 15 digits for the complete international phone number consisting of the country code, the national routing code, such as an area code, and the subscriber number. E.164 does not define regional numbering plans; however, it does provide recommendations for new implementations and uniform representation of all telephone numbers.

Country codes are necessary only when dialing telephone numbers in countries other than the originating telephone, but many networks permit them for all calls.

Following ITU-T specification E.123, international telephone numbers are commonly indicated in listings by prefixing the country code with a plus sign (+). This reminds the subscriber to dial the international access code of the country from which the call is placed. For example, the international dialing prefix or access code in all NANP countries is 011, and 00 in most other countries. On modern mobile telephones and many voice over IP services, the plus sign can usually be dialed and functions directly as the international access code. Peer-to-peer SIP uses Dynamic Delegation Discovery System to perform endpoint discovery, and therefore E.164 numbers.

=== Special services ===
Within the system of country codes, the ITU has defined certain prefixes for special services. The ITU also assigns codes for independent international networks, such as satellite systems, spanning beyond the scope of regional authorities.

Some special international routing codes are the following:

- 388 5 – shared code for groups of nations
- 388 3 – European Telephony Numbering Space – Europe-wide services (discontinued)
- 800 – International Freephone (UIFN)
- 808 – reserved for Shared Cost Services
- 878 – Universal Personal Telecommunications services
- 881 – Global Mobile Satellite System
- 882 and 883 – International Networks
- 888 - international disaster relief operations
- 979 – International Premium Rate Service
- 991 – International Telecommunications Public Correspondence Service trial (ITPCS)
- 999 – reserved for future global service

=== Satellite telephone systems ===
Satellite phones are typically issued with telephone numbers with a special country calling code, for example:

- Inmarsat: 870: SNAC (Single Network Access Code)
- ICO Global: 881 0, 881 1
- Ellipso: 881 2, 881 3
- Iridium: 881 6, 881 7
- Globalstar: 881 8, 881 9
- Emsat: 882 13
- Thuraya: 882 16
- ACeS: 882 20

Some satellite telephones are issued with telephone numbers from a national numbering plan; for example, Globalstar issues NANP telephone numbers.

=== Integrated telephone numbering plan ===
In an integrated telephone numbering plan, multiple countries share a single ITU country code. For example, the North American Numbering Plan comprises 25 countries or dependent territories in North America and the Caribbean under country code 1. Similarly, in eastern Europe and Asia, world numbering zone 7 comprises Russia and Kazakhstan with country code 7.

== Private numbering plan ==
Like a public telecommunications network, a private telephone network in an enterprise or within an organizational campus may implement a private numbering plan for the installed base of telephones for internal communication. Such networks operate a private switching system or a private branch exchange (PBX) within the network. The internal numbers assigned are often called extension numbers, as the internal numbering plan extends an official, published main access number for the entire network. A caller from within the network only dials the extension number assigned to another internal destination telephone.

A private numbering plan provides the convenience of mapping station telephone numbers to other commonly used numbering schemes in an enterprise. For example, station numbers may be assigned as the room number of a hotel or hospital. Station numbers may also be strategically mapped to certain keywords composed from the letters on the telephone dial, such as 4357 (help) to reach a help desk.

The internal number assignments may be independent of any direct inward dialing (DID) services provided by external telecommunication vendors. For numbers without DID access, the internal switch relays externally originated calls via an operator, an automated attendant or an electronic interactive voice response system. Telephone numbers for users within such systems are often published by suffixing the official telephone number with the extension number, e.g., 1 800 555-0001 x2055.

Some systems may automatically map a large block of DID numbers (differing only in a trailing sequence of digits) to a corresponding block of individual internal stations, allowing each of them to be reached directly from the public switched telephone network. In some of these cases, a special shorter dial-in number can be used to reach an operator who can be asked for general information, e.g. help looking up or connecting to internal numbers. For example, individual extensions at Universität des Saarlandes can be dialed directly from outside via their four-digit internal extension +49-681-302-xxxx, whereas the university's official main number is +49-681-302-0 (49 is the country code for Germany, 681 is the area code for Saarbrücken, 302 the prefix for the university).

Callers within a private numbering plan often dial a trunk prefix to reach a national or international destination (outside line) or to access a leased line (or tie-line) to another location within the same enterprise. A large manufacturer with factories and offices in multiple cities may use a prefix (such as '8') followed by an internal routing code to indicate a city or location, then an individual four- or five-digit extension number at the destination site. A common trunk prefix for an outside line on North American systems is the digit 9, followed by the outside destination number.

Additional dial plan customisations, such as single-digit access to a hotel front desk or room service from an individual room, are available at the sole discretion of the PBX owner.

== Numbering plan indicator ==
Signaling in telecommunication networks is specific to the technology in use for each link. During signaling, it is common that additional information is passed between switching systems that is not represented in telephone numbers, which serve only as network addresses of endpoints. One such information element is the numbering plan indicator (NPI). It is a number defined in the ITU standard Q.713, paragraph 3.4.2.3.3, indicating the numbering plan of the attached telephone number. NPIs can be found in Signalling Connection Control Part (SCCP) and short message service (SMS) messages. As of 2004, the following numbering plans and their respective numbering plan indicator values have been defined:

| NPI | Description | Standard |
|---|---|---|
| 0 | unknown | |
| 1 | ISDN Telephony | E.164 |
| 2 | generic | |
| 3 | data | X.121 |
| 4 | telex | F69 |
| 5 | maritime mobile | E.210 and E.211 |
| 6 | land mobile | E.212 |
| 7 | ISDN/mobile | E.214 |

== Subscriber dialing procedures ==
While a telephone numbering plan specifies the digit sequence assigned to each telephone or wire line, establishing the network addresses needed for routing calls, numbering plan administrators may define certain dialing procedures for placing calls. This may include the dialing of additional prefixes necessary for administrative or technical reasons, or it may permit short code sequences for convenience or speed of service, such as in cases of emergency. The body of dialing procedures of a numbering plan administration is often called a dial plan.

A dial plan establishes the expected sequence of digits dialed on subscriber premises equipment, such as telephones, in private branch exchange (PBX) systems, or in other telephone switches to effect access to the telephone networks for the routing of telephone calls, or to effect or activate specific service features by the local telephone company, such as 311 or 411 service.

=== Variable-length dialing ===
Within the North American Numbering Plan (NANP), the administration defines standard and permissive dialing procedures, specifying the number of mandatory digits to be dialed for local calls within a single numbering plan area (NPA), as well as alternate, optional sequences, such as adding the prefix 1 before the telephone number.

Despite the closed numbering plan in the NANP, different dialing procedures exist in many of the territories for local and long-distance telephone calls. This means that to call another number within the same city or area, callers need to dial only a subset of the full telephone number. For example, in the NANP, only the seven-digit number may need to be dialed, but for calls outside the local numbering plan area, the full number including the area code is required. In these situations, ITU-T Recommendation E.123 suggests to list the area code in parentheses, signifying that in some cases the area code is optional or may not be required.

Internationally, an area code is typically prefixed by a domestic trunk access code (usually 0) when dialing from inside a country, but must not be dialed when calling from other countries; there are exceptions, such as for Italian land lines.

To call a number in Sydney, Australia, for example:

- xxxx xxxx (within Sydney and other locations within New South Wales and the Australian Capital Territory - no area code required)
- 02 xxxx xxxx (outside New South Wales and the Australian Capital Territory, but still within Australia - the area code is required)
- 61 2 xxxx xxxx (outside Australia)

Dialing internationally, the country code must be preceded by the international access code, which is 00 in many countries per ITU recommendation. This is indicated in notation when the character + precedes the area code. Some telephone types, especially mobile phones, allow the + to be entered directly, causing automatic substitution by device or the carrier. In the North American Numbering Plan, the prefix is 011 before the destination country code.

New Zealand requires the area code to be dialed when calling between two local calling areas.

In California and New York, because of the existence of both overlay area codes (where an area code must be dialed for every call) and non-overlay area codes (where an area code is dialed only for calls outside the subscriber's home area code), "permissive home area code dialing" of 1 + the area code within the same area code, even if no area code is required, has been permitted since the mid-2000s. The manner in which a call is dialed does not affect the billing of the call. This "permissive home area code dialing" helps maintain uniformity and eliminates confusion given the different types of area code relief that has made California the nation's most "area code intensive" state.

=== Full-number dialing ===
In small countries or areas, the full telephone number is used for all calls, even in the same area. This has traditionally been the case in small countries and territories where area codes have not been required. However, there has been a trend in many countries towards making all numbers a standard length, and incorporating the area code into the subscriber's number. This usually makes the use of a trunk code obsolete. For example, to call someone in Oslo in Norway before 1992, it was necessary to dial:

- xxx xxx (within Oslo - no area code required)
- (02) xxx xxx (within Norway - outside Oslo)
- 47 2 xxx xxx (outside Norway)

After 1992, this changed to a closed eight-digit numbering plan, e.g.:

- 22xx xxxx (within Norway - including Oslo)
- 47 22xx xxxx (outside Norway)

However, in other countries, such as France, Belgium, Japan, Switzerland, South Africa and some parts of North America, the trunk code is retained for domestic calls, whether local or national, e.g.,

- Paris 01 xx xx xx xx (outside France +33 1 xxxx xxxx)
- Brussels 02 xxx xxxx (outside Belgium +32 2 xxx xxxx)
- Geneva 022 xxx xxxx (outside Switzerland +41 22 xxx xxxx)
- Cape Town 021 xxx xxxx (outside South Africa +27 21 xxx xxxx)
- New York 1 212 xxx xxxx (outside the North American Numbering Plan +1 212 xxx xxxx)
- Fukuoka 092 xxx xxxx (outside the Japanese Numbering Plan +81 92 xxx xxxx)
- India "0-10 Digit Number" (outside India +91 XXXXXXXXXX). In India due to the availability of multiple operators, the metro cities have short codes which range from 2 to 8 digits.

While some, such as Italy, require the initial zero to be dialed, even for calls from outside the country, e.g.,

- Rome 06 xxxxxxxx (outside Italy +39 06 xxxxxxxx)

While dialing a full national number takes longer than a local number without the area code, the increased use of telephones that can store numbers means that this is of decreasing importance. It also makes it easier to display numbers in the international format, as no trunk code is required—hence a number in Prague, Czech Republic, can now be displayed as:

- 2xx xxx xxx (inside Czech Republic)
- +420 2xx xxx xxx (outside Czech Republic)

as opposed to (before September 21, 2002):

- 02 / xx xx xx xx (inside Czech Republic)
- +420 2 / xx xx xx xx (outside Czech Republic)

== See also ==
- Category:Telephone numbers by country
- National conventions for writing telephone numbers
- List of telephone country codes
- List of North American Numbering Plan area codes
- Carrier access code
- Telephone exchange names
