= Country code =

Identification code for countries

A country code is a short alphanumeric identification code for countries and dependent areas. Its primary use is in data processing and communications. Several identification systems have been developed.

The term country code frequently refers to ISO 3166-1 alpha-2 (a part of the ISO 3166 standard), as well as the telephone country code, which is embodied in the E.164 recommendation by the International Telecommunication Union (ITU).

== ISO 3166-1 ==
The standard ISO 3166-1 defines short identification codes for most countries and dependent areas:

- ISO 3166-1 alpha-2: two-letter code
- ISO 3166-1 alpha-3: three-letter code
- ISO 3166-1 numeric: three-digit code

The two-letter codes are used as the basis for other codes and applications, for example,

- for ISO 4217 currency codes
- with deviations, for country code top-level domain names (ccTLDs) on the Internet: list of Internet TLDs.

Other applications are defined in ISO 3166-1 alpha-2.

== ITU ==
=== Telephone country codes ===
Telephone country codes are telephone number prefixes for international direct dialing (IDD), a system for reaching subscribers in foreign areas via international telecommunication networks. Country codes are defined by the International Telecommunication Union (ITU) in ITU-T standards E.123 and E.164.

Country codes constitute the international telephone numbering plan. They are dialed before the national telephone number of a destination in a foreign country or area, but typically require at least one additional prefix, the international call prefix which is an exit code from the national numbering plan to the international one. ITU standards recommend the digit sequence 00 for the prefix, and most countries comply.

=== Other ITU codes ===
The ITU also maintains the following other country codes:

- The E.212 mobile country codes (MCC), for mobile/wireless phone addresses.
- The ITU prefix, the first few characters of call signs of radio and television stations (maritime, aeronautical, broadcasting, and other types) to identify their country of origin
  - ITU prefix - amateur and experimental stations, specific prefixes for amateur and experimental radio use, so that operators can be identified by their country of origin. These prefixes are legally administered by the national entity to which prefix ranges are assigned.
- Maritime identification digits, to identify countries in maritime mobile radio transmissions.
- ITU letter codes, to identify ITU member-countries.

== Other country codes ==
The developers of ISO 3166 intended that in time it would replace other coding systems.

=== Other general-purpose systems ===
- FIPS country codes: Federal Information Processing Standard (FIPS) 10-4 defined two-letter codes used by the U.S. government and in the CIA World Factbook. On September 2, 2008, FIPS 10-4 was one of ten standards withdrawn by NIST as a Federal Information Processing Standard.
- GOST 7.67: country codes in Cyrillic from the GOST standards committee.
- NATO country codes: North Atlantic Treaty Organization (NATO) initially used two-letter codes largely borrowed from the FIPS 10-4 codes mentioned above. In 2003, the eighth edition of the Standardisation Agreement (STANAG) adopted the ISO 3166 three-letter codes with one exception (the code for Macedonia). With the ninth edition, NATO is transitioning to four- and six-letter codes based on ISO 3166 with a few exceptions and additions.
- The first-level of the Nomenclature of Territorial Units for Statistics of the European Union, mostly focusing on EU member states.
- UNDP country codes, used by the United Nations Development Programme (UNDP).
- World Area Codes, used by the Bureau of Transportation Statistics, part of the United States Department of Transportation.

=== Business ===
- GS1 country codes, defined by the nonprofit international organization GS1 for its Global Trade Item Number (GTIN) and other standards for barcodes and the corresponding issue company prefixes.
- WIPO ST.3, defined by World Intellectual Property Organization (WIPO) to identify both countries and regional intellectual property organizations.

=== Sport ===
- IOC country codes, defined by the International Olympic Committee (IOC) to identify member countries, specifically National Olympic Committees.
- FIFA country codes, to identify member and non-member countries of FIFA (Fédération Internationale de Football Association).

=== Transport ===
- International vehicle registration codes, under the 1949 Geneva Convention on Road Traffic and the 1968 Vienna Convention on Road Traffic to identify the country that issued a motor vehicle's vehicle registration plate.
  - Diplomatic license plates in the United States, issued by the U.S. State Department to accredited diplomats, include a two-letter country code to identify that representative's country.
- ICAO aircraft registration prefixes, defined by the International Civil Aviation Organization (ICAO) to identify an aircraft's country of registration.
- ICAO airport code prefixes, defined by the ICAO to identify an airport's country.
- UIC country codes, to identify members of the International Union of Railways (UIC).

=== Other specific-purpose codes ===
- Country code top-level domain (ccTLD), an Internet top-level domain. Originally defined by the Internet Assigned Numbers Authority (IANA), it was initially based on ISO 3166-1 alpha-2.
- World Meteorological Organization (WMO) maintains its own list of country codes in reporting meteorological observations.

== Other codings ==
Country identities may be encoded in the following coding systems:

- The initial digits of International Standard Book Numbers (ISBN) are group identifiers for countries, areas, or language regions.

== Lists of country codes by country ==
A - B - C - D–E - F - G - H–I - J–K - L - M - N - O–Q - R - S - T - U–Z

== See also ==
- ISO 3166: standard codes for geographical names
- Language code
- Numbering scheme
