= Lists of country codes =

This is a listing of lists of country codes:

- List of ISO 3166 country codes (ISO 3166)
- ITU country code (International Telecommunication Union)
  - List of telephone country codes E.164
  - Mobile country code E.212
  - List of aircraft registration prefixes
  - Maritime identification digits
  - List of ITU letter codes (radiocommunication division)
- List of UIC country codes (International Union of Railways)
- List of vehicle registration codes
- List of GS1 country codes
- List of FIPS country codes
- List of NATO country codes
- List of IOC country codes (International Olympic Committee)
- List of FIFA country codes (International Federation of Association Football)
- List of CGF country codes (Commonwealth Sport)
- Comparison of alphabetic country codes, disambiguation page
- Two-letter country codes, disambiguation page

== Lists of country codes by country ==
A – B – C – D – E – F – G – H – I – J – K – L – M – N – O – P – Q – R – S – T – U – V – W – X – Y – Z
