= List of country codes: L–Z =

"Other" sections may contain 3-letter codes of sports organizations when they are different from both ISO and IOC Codes.

== L ==
=== Laos ===
ISO 3166-1 numeric 418	ISO 3166-1 alpha-3 LAO	ISO 3166-1 alpha-2 LA	ICAO airport code prefix VL
E.164 code 856	IOC country code LAO	Country code top-level domain.la	ICAO aircraft regis. prefix RDPL-
E.212 mobile country code 457	NATO three-letter code LAO	NATO two-letter code LA	LOC MARC code LS
ITU Maritime ID 531	ITU letter code LAO	FIPS country code LA	License plate code LAO
GS1 GTIN prefix —	UNDP country code LAO	WMO country code LA	ITU callsign prefixes XWA-XWZ

=== Latvia ===
ISO 3166-1 numeric 428	ISO 3166-1 alpha-3 LVA	ISO 3166-1 alpha-2 LV	ICAO airport code prefix EV
E.164 code 371	IOC country code LAT	Country code top-level domain.lv	ICAO aircraft regis. prefix YL-
E.212 mobile country code 247	NATO three-letter code LVA	NATO two-letter code LG	LOC MARC code LV
ITU Maritime ID 275	ITU letter code LVA	FIPS country code LG	License plate code LV
GS1 GTIN prefix 475	UNDP country code LAT	WMO country code LV	ITU callsign prefixes YLA-YLZ

=== Lebanon ===
ISO 3166-1 numeric 422	ISO 3166-1 alpha-3 LBN	ISO 3166-1 alpha-2 LB	ICAO airport code prefix OL
E.164 code 961	IOC country code LBN	Country code top-level domain.lb	ICAO aircraft regis. prefix OD-
E.212 mobile country code 415	NATO three-letter code LBN	NATO two-letter code LE	LOC MARC code LE
ITU Maritime ID 450	ITU letter code LBN	FIPS country code LE	License plate code RL
GS1 GTIN prefix 528	UNDP country code LEB	WMO country code LB	ITU callsign prefixes ODA-ODZ

=== Lesotho ===
ISO 3166-1 numeric 426	ISO 3166-1 alpha-3 LSO	ISO 3166-1 alpha-2 LS	ICAO airport code prefix FX
E.164 code 266	IOC country code LES	Country code top-level domain.ls	ICAO aircraft regis. prefix 7P-
E.212 mobile country code 651	NATO three-letter code LSO	NATO two-letter code LT	LOC MARC code LO
ITU Maritime ID 644	ITU letter code LSO	FIPS country code LT	License plate code LS
GS1 GTIN prefix —	UNDP country code LES	WMO country code LS	ITU callsign prefixes 7PA-7PZ

=== Liberia ===
ISO 3166-1 numeric 430	ISO 3166-1 alpha-3 LBR	ISO 3166-1 alpha-2 LR	ICAO airport code prefix GL
E.164 code 231	IOC country code LBR	Country code top-level domain.lr	ICAO aircraft regis. prefix EL-
E.212 mobile country code 618	NATO three-letter code LBR	NATO two-letter code LI	LOC MARC code LB
ITU Maritime ID 636, 637	ITU letter code LBR	FIPS country code LI	License plate code LB
GS1 GTIN prefix —	UNDP country code LIR	WMO country code LI	ITU callsign prefixes 5LA-5MZ, 6ZA-6ZZ, A8A-A8Z; D5A-D5Z, ELA-ELZ

=== Libya ===
ISO 3166-1 numeric 434	ISO 3166-1 alpha-3 LBY	ISO 3166-1 alpha-2 LY	ICAO airport code prefix HL
E.164 code 218	IOC country code LBA	Country code top-level domain.ly	ICAO aircraft regis. prefix 5A-
E.212 mobile country code 606	NATO three-letter code LBY	NATO two-letter code LY	LOC MARC code LY
ITU Maritime ID 642	ITU letter code LBY	FIPS country code LY	License plate code LAR
GS1 GTIN prefix 624	UNDP country code LIB	WMO country code LY	ITU callsign prefixes 5AA-5AZ

=== Liechtenstein ===
ISO 3166-1 numeric 438	ISO 3166-1 alpha-3 LIE	ISO 3166-1 alpha-2 LI	ICAO airport code prefix —
E.164 code 423	IOC country code LIE	Country code top-level domain.li	ICAO aircraft regis. prefix HB-
E.212 mobile country code 295	NATO three-letter code LIE	NATO two-letter code LS	LOC MARC code LH
ITU Maritime ID 252	ITU letter code LIE	FIPS country code LS	License plate code FL
GS1 GTIN prefix —	UNDP country code LIE	WMO country code —	ITU callsign prefixes HB / HB0 / HB3Y

=== Lithuania ===
ISO 3166-1 numeric 440	ISO 3166-1 alpha-3 LTU	ISO 3166-1 alpha-2 LT	ICAO airport code prefix EY
E.164 code 370	IOC country code LTU	Country code top-level domain.lt	ICAO aircraft regis. prefix LY-
E.212 mobile country code 246	NATO three-letter code LTU	NATO two-letter code LH	LOC MARC code LI
ITU Maritime ID 277	ITU letter code LTU	FIPS country code LH	License plate code LT
GS1 GTIN prefix 477	UNDP country code LIT	WMO country code LT	ITU callsign prefixes LYA-LYZ

=== Luxembourg ===
ISO 3166-1 numeric 442	ISO 3166-1 alpha-3 LUX	ISO 3166-1 alpha-2 LU	ICAO airport code prefix EL
E.164 code 352	IOC country code LUX	Country code top-level domain.lu	ICAO aircraft regis. prefix LX-
E.212 mobile country code 270	NATO three-letter code LUX	NATO two-letter code LU	LOC MARC code LU
ITU Maritime ID 253	ITU letter code LUX	FIPS country code LU	License plate code L
GS1 GTIN prefix 540-549	UNDP country code LUX	WMO country code BX	ITU callsign prefixes LXA-LXZ

== M ==
=== Macau (administrative region of China) ===
ISO 3166-1 numeric 446	ISO 3166-1 alpha-3 MAC	ISO 3166-1 alpha-2 MO	ICAO airport code prefix VM
E.164 code 853	IOC country code —	Country code top-level domain.mo	ICAO aircraft regis. prefix B-M
E.212 mobile country code 455	NATO three-letter code MAC	NATO two-letter code MC	LOC MARC code MH
ITU Maritime ID 453	ITU letter code MAC	FIPS country code MC	License plate code —
GS1 GTIN prefix 958	UNDP country code MAC	WMO country code MU	ITU callsign prefixes XXA-XXZ

=== Madagascar ===
ISO 3166-1 numeric 450	ISO 3166-1 alpha-3 MDG	ISO 3166-1 alpha-2 MG	ICAO airport code prefix FMM, FMN, FMS
E.164 code 261	IOC country code MAD	Country code top-level domain.mg	ICAO aircraft regis. prefix 5R-
E.212 mobile country code 646	NATO three-letter code MDG	NATO two-letter code MA	LOC MARC code MG
ITU Maritime ID 647	ITU letter code MDG	FIPS country code MA	License plate code RM
GS1 GTIN prefix —	UNDP country code MAG	WMO country code MG	ITU callsign prefixes 5RA-5SZ, 6XA-6XZ

=== Malawi ===
ISO 3166-1 numeric 454	ISO 3166-1 alpha-3 MWI	ISO 3166-1 alpha-2 MW	ICAO airport code prefix FW
E.164 code 265	IOC country code MAW	Country code top-level domain.mw	ICAO aircraft regis. prefix 7Q-
E.212 mobile country code 650	NATO three-letter code MWI	NATO two-letter code MI	LOC MARC code MW
ITU Maritime ID 655	ITU letter code MWI	FIPS country code MI	License plate code MW
GS1 GTIN prefix —	UNDP country code MLW	WMO country code MW	ITU callsign prefixes 7QA-7QZ

=== Malaysia ===
ISO 3166-1 numeric 458	ISO 3166-1 alpha-3 MYS	ISO 3166-1 alpha-2 MY	ICAO airport code prefix WB, WM
E.164 code 60	IOC country code MAS	Country code top-level domain.my	ICAO aircraft regis. prefix 9M-
E.212 mobile country code 502	NATO three-letter code MYS	NATO two-letter code MY	LOC MARC code MY
ITU Maritime ID 533	ITU letter code MLA	FIPS country code MY	License plate code MAL
GS1 GTIN prefix 955	UNDP country code MAL	WMO country code MS	ITU callsign prefixes 9MA-9MZ, 9WA-9WZ

=== Maldives ===
ISO 3166-1 numeric 462	ISO 3166-1 alpha-3 MDV	ISO 3166-1 alpha-2 MV	ICAO airport code prefix VR
E.164 code 960	IOC country code MDV	Country code top-level domain.mv	ICAO aircraft regis. prefix 8Q-
E.212 mobile country code 472	NATO three-letter code MDV	NATO two-letter code MV	LOC MARC code XC
ITU Maritime ID 455	ITU letter code MLD	FIPS country code MV	License plate code MV (unofficial)
GS1 GTIN prefix —	UNDP country code MDV	WMO country code MV	ITU callsign prefixes 8QA-8QZ

=== Mali ===
ISO 3166-1 numeric 466	ISO 3166-1 alpha-3 MLI	ISO 3166-1 alpha-2 ML	ICAO airport code prefix GA
E.164 code 223	IOC country code MLI	Country code top-level domain.ml	ICAO aircraft regis. prefix TZ-
E.212 mobile country code 610	NATO three-letter code MLI	NATO two-letter code ML	LOC MARC code ML
ITU Maritime ID 649	ITU letter code MLI	FIPS country code ML	License plate code RMM
GS1 GTIN prefix —	UNDP country code MLI	WMO country code MI	ITU callsign prefixes TZA-TZZ

=== Malta ===
ISO 3166-1 numeric 470	ISO 3166-1 alpha-3 MLT	ISO 3166-1 alpha-2 MT	ICAO airport code prefix LM
E.164 code 356	IOC country code MLT	Country code top-level domain.mt	ICAO aircraft regis. prefix 9H-
E.212 mobile country code 278	NATO three-letter code MLT	NATO two-letter code MT	LOC MARC code MM
ITU Maritime ID 215, 248, 249, 256	ITU letter code MLT	FIPS country code MT	License plate code M
GS1 GTIN prefix 535	UNDP country code MAT	WMO country code ML	ITU callsign prefixes 9HA-9HZ

=== Marshall Islands ===
ISO 3166-1 numeric 584	ISO 3166-1 alpha-3 MHL	ISO 3166-1 alpha-2 MH	ICAO airport code prefix EN, PK
E.164 code 692	IOC country code MHL	Country code top-level domain.mh	ICAO aircraft regis. prefix V7-
E.212 mobile country code 551	NATO three-letter code MHL	NATO two-letter code RM	LOC MARC code XE
ITU Maritime ID 538	ITU letter code MHL	FIPS country code RM	License plate code MH (unofficial)
GS1 GTIN prefix —	UNDP country code MAS	WMO country code MH	ITU callsign prefixes V7A-V7Z

=== Martinique (department of France) ===
ISO 3166-1 numeric 474	ISO 3166-1 alpha-3 MTQ	ISO 3166-1 alpha-2 MQ	ICAO airport code prefix TF
E.164 code 596	IOC country code —	Country code top-level domain.mq	ICAO aircraft regis. prefix F-
E.212 mobile country code 340	NATO three-letter code MTQ	NATO two-letter code MB	LOC MARC code MQ
ITU Maritime ID 347	ITU letter code MRT	FIPS country code MB	License plate code —
GS1 GTIN prefix —	UNDP country code MAQ	WMO country code MR	ITU callsign prefixes —

=== Mauritania ===
ISO 3166-1 numeric 478	ISO 3166-1 alpha-3 MRT	ISO 3166-1 alpha-2 MR	ICAO airport code prefix GQ
E.164 code 222	IOC country code MTN	Country code top-level domain.mr	ICAO aircraft regis. prefix 5T-
E.212 mobile country code 609	NATO three-letter code MRT	NATO two-letter code MR	LOC MARC code MU
ITU Maritime ID 654	ITU letter code MTN	FIPS country code MR	License plate code RIM
GS1 GTIN prefix —	UNDP country code MAU	WMO country code MT	ITU callsign prefixes 5TA-5TZ

=== Mauritius ===
ISO 3166-1 numeric 480	ISO 3166-1 alpha-3 MUS	ISO 3166-1 alpha-2 MU	ICAO airport code prefix FI
E.164 code 230	IOC country code MRI	Country code top-level domain.mu	ICAO aircraft regis. prefix 3B-
E.212 mobile country code 617	NATO three-letter code MUS	NATO two-letter code MP	LOC MARC code MF
ITU Maritime ID 645	ITU letter code MAU	FIPS country code MP	License plate code MS
GS1 GTIN prefix 609	UNDP country code MAR	WMO country code MA	ITU callsign prefixes 3BA-3BZ

=== Mayotte (department of France) ===
ISO 3166-1 numeric 175	ISO 3166-1 alpha-3 MYT	ISO 3166-1 alpha-2 YT	ICAO airport code prefix FM
E.164 code 269	IOC country code —	Country code top-level domain.yt	ICAO aircraft regis. prefix F-
E.212 mobile country code —	NATO three-letter code MYT	NATO two-letter code ME	LOC MARC code OT
ITU Maritime ID —	ITU letter code MYT	FIPS country code MF	License plate code —
GS1 GTIN prefix —	UNDP country code —	WMO country code —	ITU callsign prefixes —

=== Mexico ===
ISO 3166-1 numeric 484	ISO 3166-1 alpha-3 MEX	ISO 3166-1 alpha-2 MX	ICAO airport code prefix MM
E.164 code 52	IOC country code MEX	Country code top-level domain.mx	ICAO aircraft regis. prefix XA-, XB-, XC-
E.212 mobile country code 334	NATO three-letter code MEX	NATO two-letter code MX	LOC MARC code MX
ITU Maritime ID 345	ITU letter code MEX	FIPS country code MX	License plate code MEX
GS1 GTIN prefix 750	UNDP country code MEX	WMO country code MX	ITU callsign prefixes 4AA-4CZ,6DA-6JZ,XAA-XIZ

=== Federated States of Micronesia ===
ISO 3166-1 numeric 582	ISO 3166-1 alpha-3 FSM	ISO 3166-1 alpha-2 FM	ICAO airport code prefix PT
E.164 code 691	IOC country code FSM	Country code top-level domain.fm	ICAO aircraft regis. prefix V6-
E.212 mobile country code 550	NATO three-letter code FSM	NATO two-letter code FM	LOC MARC code FM
ITU Maritime ID 510	ITU letter code FSM	FIPS country code FM	License plate code FSM (unofficial)
GS1 GTIN prefix —	UNDP country code MIC	WMO country code KA	ITU callsign prefixes V6A—V6Z

=== Moldova ===
ISO 3166-1 numeric 498	ISO 3166-1 alpha-3 MDA	ISO 3166-1 alpha-2 MD	ICAO airport code prefix LU
E.164 code 373	IOC country code MDA	Country code top-level domain.md	ICAO aircraft regis. prefix ER-
E.212 mobile country code 259	NATO three-letter code MDA	NATO two-letter code MD	LOC MARC code MV
ITU Maritime ID 214	ITU letter code MDA	FIPS country code MD	License plate code MD
GS1 GTIN prefix 484	UNDP country code MOL	WMO country code RM	ITU callsign prefixes ERA-ERZ

=== Monaco ===
ISO 3166-1 numeric 492	ISO 3166-1 alpha-3 MCO	ISO 3166-1 alpha-2 MC	ICAO airport code prefix LN
E.164 code 377	IOC country code MON	Country code top-level domain.mc	ICAO aircraft regis. prefix 3A-
E.212 mobile country code 212	NATO three-letter code MCO	NATO two-letter code MN	LOC MARC code MC
ITU Maritime ID 254	ITU letter code MCO	FIPS country code MN	License plate code MC
GS1 GTIN prefix —	UNDP country code MNC	WMO country code M3	ITU callsign prefixes 3AA-3AZ

=== Mongolia ===
ISO 3166-1 numeric 496	ISO 3166-1 alpha-3 MNG	ISO 3166-1 alpha-2 MN	ICAO airport code prefix ZM
E.164 code 976	IOC country code MGL	Country code top-level domain.mn	ICAO aircraft regis. prefix JU-
E.212 mobile country code 428	NATO three-letter code MNG	NATO two-letter code MG	LOC MARC code MP
ITU Maritime ID 457	ITU letter code MNG	FIPS country code MG	License plate code MNG
GS1 GTIN prefix 865	UNDP country code MON	WMO country code MO	ITU callsign prefixes JTA-JVZ

=== Montenegro ===
ISO 3166-1 numeric 499	ISO 3166-1 alpha-3 MNE	ISO 3166-1 alpha-2 ME	ICAO airport code prefix LY
E.164 code 382	IOC country code MNE	Country code top-level domain.me	ICAO aircraft regis. prefix 4O-
E.212 mobile country code 297	NATO three-letter code MNE	NATO two-letter code ME	LOC MARC code MO
ITU Maritime ID 262	ITU letter code MNE	FIPS country code MJ	License plate code MNE
GS1 GTIN prefix 389	UNDP country code MTN	WMO country code M4	ITU callsign prefixes 4OA-4OZ

=== Montserrat (UK territory) ===
ISO 3166-1 numeric 500	ISO 3166-1 alpha-3 MSR	ISO 3166-1 alpha-2 MS	ICAO airport code prefix TR
E.164 code 1	IOC country code —	Country code top-level domain.ms	ICAO aircraft regis. prefix VP-M-
E.212 mobile country code 354	NATO three-letter code MSR	NATO two-letter code MH	LOC MARC code MJ
ITU Maritime ID 348	ITU letter code MSR	FIPS country code MH	License plate code —
GS1 GTIN prefix —	UNDP country code MOT	WMO country code M2	ITU callsign prefixes —

=== Morocco ===
ISO 3166-1 numeric 504	ISO 3166-1 alpha-3 MAR	ISO 3166-1 alpha-2 MA	ICAO airport code prefix GM
E.164 code 212	IOC country code MAR	Country code top-level domain.ma	ICAO aircraft regis. prefix CN-
E.212 mobile country code 604	NATO three-letter code MAR	NATO two-letter code MO	LOC MARC code MR
ITU Maritime ID 242	ITU letter code MRC	FIPS country code MO	License plate code MA
GS1 GTIN prefix 611	UNDP country code MOR	WMO country code MC	ITU callsign prefixes 5CA-5GZ, CNA-CNZ

=== Mozambique ===
ISO 3166-1 numeric 508	ISO 3166-1 alpha-3 MOZ	ISO 3166-1 alpha-2 MZ	ICAO airport code prefix FQ
E.164 code 258	IOC country code MOZ	Country code top-level domain.mz	ICAO aircraft regis. prefix C9-
E.212 mobile country code 643	NATO three-letter code MOZ	NATO two-letter code MZ	LOC MARC code MZ
ITU Maritime ID 650	ITU letter code MOZ	FIPS country code MZ	License plate code MOC
GS1 GTIN prefix —	UNDP country code MOZ	WMO country code MZ	ITU callsign prefixes C8A-C9Z

=== Myanmar ===
ISO 3166-1 numeric -	ISO 3166-1 alpha-3 MMR	ISO 3166-1 alpha-2 MM	ICAO airport code prefix VY
E.164 code 95	IOC country code MMR	Country code top-level domain.mm	ICAO aircraft regis. prefix XY-
E.212 mobile country code 95	NATO three-letter code MMR	NATO two-letter code MM	LOC MARC code MM
ITU Maritime ID 506	ITU letter code MMR	FIPS country code MM	License plate code MMR
GS1 GTIN prefix 883	UNDP country code MMR	WMO country code MM	ITU callsign prefixes XY–XZ

== N ==
=== Namibia ===
ISO 3166-1 numeric 516	ISO 3166-1 alpha-3 NAM	ISO 3166-1 alpha-2 NA	ICAO airport code prefix FY
E.164 code 264	IOC country code NAM	Country code top-level domain.na	ICAO aircraft regis. prefix V5-
E.212 mobile country code 649	NATO three-letter code NAM	NATO two-letter code WA	LOC MARC code SX
ITU Maritime ID 659	ITU letter code NMB	FIPS country code WA	License plate code NAM
GS1 GTIN prefix —	UNDP country code NAM	WMO country code NM	ITU callsign prefixes V5A-V5Z

=== Nauru ===
ISO 3166-1 numeric 520	ISO 3166-1 alpha-3 NRU	ISO 3166-1 alpha-2 NR	ICAO airport code prefix AN
E.164 code 674	IOC country code NRU	Country code top-level domain.nr	ICAO aircraft regis. prefix C2-
E.212 mobile country code 536	NATO three-letter code NRU	NATO two-letter code NR	LOC MARC code NU
ITU Maritime ID 544	ITU letter code NRU	FIPS country code NR	License plate code NAU
GS1 GTIN prefix —	UNDP country code NAU	WMO country code NW	ITU callsign prefixes C2A-C2Z

=== Nepal ===
ISO 3166-1 numeric 524	ISO 3166-1 alpha-3 NPL	ISO 3166-1 alpha-2 NP	ICAO airport code prefix VN
E.164 code 977	IOC country code NEP	Country code top-level domain.np	ICAO aircraft regis. prefix 9N-
E.212 mobile country code 429	NATO three-letter code NPL	NATO two-letter code NP	LOC MARC code NP
ITU Maritime ID 459	ITU letter code NPL	FIPS country code NP	License plate code NEP
GS1 GTIN prefix -	UNDP country code NEP	WMO country code NP	ITU callsign prefixes 9NA-9NZ

=== Netherlands ===
ISO 3166-1 numeric 528	ISO 3166-1 alpha-3 NLD	ISO 3166-1 alpha-2 NL	ICAO airport code prefix EH
E.164 code 31	IOC country code NED	Country code top-level domain.nl	ICAO aircraft regis. prefix PH-
E.212 mobile country code 204	NATO three-letter code NLD	NATO two-letter code NL	LOC MARC code NE
ITU Maritime ID 244, 245, 246	ITU letter code HOL	FIPS country code NL	License plate code NL
GS1 GTIN prefix 870-879	UNDP country code NET	WMO country code NL	ITU callsign prefixes PAA-PIZ

=== New Caledonia (collectivity of France) ===
ISO 3166-1 numeric 540	ISO 3166-1 alpha-3 NCL	ISO 3166-1 alpha-2 NC	ICAO airport code prefix NW
E.164 code 687	IOC country code —	Country code top-level domain.nc	ICAO aircraft regis. prefix F-
E.212 mobile country code 546	NATO three-letter code NCL	NATO two-letter code NC	LOC MARC code NL
ITU Maritime ID 540	ITU letter code NCL	FIPS country code NC	License plate code F
GS1 GTIN prefix —	UNDP country code NCA	WMO country code NC	ITU callsign prefixes —

=== New Zealand ===
ISO 3166-1 numeric 554	ISO 3166-1 alpha-3 NZL	ISO 3166-1 alpha-2 NZ	ICAO airport code prefix NZ, PL
E.164 code 64	IOC country code NZL	Country code top-level domain.nz	ICAO aircraft regis. prefix ZK-, ZL-, ZM-
E.212 mobile country code 530	NATO three-letter code NZL	NATO two-letter code NZ	LOC MARC code NZ
ITU Maritime ID 512	ITU letter code NZL	FIPS country code NZ	License plate code NZ
GS1 GTIN prefix 940-949	UNDP country code NZE	WMO country code NZ	ITU callsign prefixes ZKA-ZMZ

=== Nicaragua ===
ISO 3166-1 numeric 558	ISO 3166-1 alpha-3 NIC	ISO 3166-1 alpha-2 NI	ICAO airport code prefix MN
E.164 code 505	IOC country code NCA	Country code top-level domain.ni	ICAO aircraft regis. prefix YN-
E.212 mobile country code 710	NATO three-letter code NIC	NATO two-letter code NU	LOC MARC code NQ
ITU Maritime ID 350	ITU letter code NCG	FIPS country code NU	License plate code NIC
GS1 GTIN prefix 743	UNDP country code NIC	WMO country code NK	ITU callsign prefixes H6A-H7Z,HTA-HTZ,YNA-YNZ

=== Niger ===
ISO 3166-1 numeric 562	ISO 3166-1 alpha-3 NER	ISO 3166-1 alpha-2 NE	ICAO airport code prefix DR
E.164 code 227	IOC country code NIG	Country code top-level domain.ne	ICAO aircraft regis. prefix 5U-
E.212 mobile country code 614	NATO three-letter code NER	NATO two-letter code NG	LOC MARC code NG
ITU Maritime ID 656	ITU letter code NGR	FIPS country code NG	License plate code RN
GS1 GTIN prefix —	UNDP country code NER	WMO country code NR	ITU callsign prefixes 5UA-5UZ

=== Nigeria ===
ISO 3166-1 numeric 566	ISO 3166-1 alpha-3 NGA	ISO 3166-1 alpha-2 NG	ICAO airport code prefix DN
E.164 code 234	IOC country code NGR	Country code top-level domain.ng	ICAO aircraft regis. prefix 5N-
E.212 mobile country code 234	NATO three-letter code NGA	NATO two-letter code NI	LOC MARC code NR
ITU Maritime ID 657	ITU letter code NIG	FIPS country code NI	License plate code WAN
GS1 GTIN prefix 615	UNDP country code NIR	WMO country code NI	ITU callsign prefixes 5NA-5OZ

=== Niue (associated with New Zealand) ===
ISO 3166-1 numeric 570	ISO 3166-1 alpha-3 NIU	ISO 3166-1 alpha-2 NU	ICAO airport code prefix NI
E.164 code 683	IOC country code —	Country code top-level domain.nu	ICAO aircraft regis. prefix —
E.212 mobile country code 555	NATO three-letter code NIU	NATO two-letter code NE	LOC MARC code XH
ITU Maritime ID 542	ITU letter code NIU	FIPS country code NE	License plate code —
GS1 GTIN prefix —	UNDP country code NIU	WMO country code N1	ITU callsign prefixes —

=== Norfolk Island (territory of Australia) ===
ISO 3166-1 numeric 574	ISO 3166-1 alpha-3 NFK	ISO 3166-1 alpha-2 NF	ICAO airport code prefix —
E.164 code 672	IOC country code —	Country code top-level domain.nf	ICAO aircraft regis. prefix VH-
E.212 mobile country code 505	NATO three-letter code NFK	NATO two-letter code NF	LOC MARC code NX
ITU Maritime ID —	ITU letter code NFK	FIPS country code NF	License plate code —
GS1 GTIN prefix —	UNDP country code —	WMO country code —	ITU callsign prefixes —

=== North Macedonia ===
ISO 3166-1 numeric 807	ISO 3166-1 alpha-3 MKD	ISO 3166-1 alpha-2 MK	ICAO airport code prefix LW
E.164 code 389	IOC country code MKD	Country code top-level domain.mk	ICAO aircraft regis. prefix Z3-
E.212 mobile country code 294	NATO three-letter code MKD	NATO two-letter code MK	LOC MARC code XN
ITU Maritime ID 274	ITU letter code MKD	FIPS country code MK	License plate code NMK
GS1 GTIN prefix 531	UNDP country code MCD	WMO country code MJ	ITU callsign prefixes Z3A-Z3Z

=== Northern Mariana Islands (US territory) ===
ISO 3166-1 numeric 580	ISO 3166-1 alpha-3 MNP	ISO 3166-1 alpha-2 MP	ICAO airport code prefix PG
E.164 code 1	IOC country code —	Country code top-level domain.mp	ICAO aircraft regis. prefix —
E.212 mobile country code 534	NATO three-letter code MNP	NATO two-letter code CQ	LOC MARC code NW
ITU Maritime ID 536	ITU letter code MRA	FIPS country code CQ	License plate code —
GS1 GTIN prefix —	UNDP country code —	WMO country code MY	ITU callsign prefixes —

=== Norway ===
ISO 3166-1 numeric 578	ISO 3166-1 alpha-3 NOR	ISO 3166-1 alpha-2 NO	ICAO airport code prefix EN
E.164 code 47	IOC country code NOR	Country code top-level domain.no	ICAO aircraft regis. prefix LN-
E.212 mobile country code 242	NATO three-letter code NOR	NATO two-letter code NO	LOC MARC code NO
ITU Maritime ID 257, 258, 259	ITU letter code NOR	FIPS country code NO	License plate code N
GS1 GTIN prefix 700-709	UNDP country code NOR	WMO country code NO	ITU callsign prefixes 3YA-3YZ,JWA-JXZ,LAA-LNZ

== O ==
=== Oman ===
ISO 3166-1 numeric 512	ISO 3166-1 alpha-3 OMN	ISO 3166-1 alpha-2 OM	ICAO airport code prefix OO
E.164 code 968	IOC country code OMA	Country code top-level domain.om	ICAO aircraft regis. prefix A4O-
E.212 mobile country code 422	NATO three-letter code OMN	NATO two-letter code MU	LOC MARC code MK
ITU Maritime ID 461	ITU letter code OMA	FIPS country code MU	License plate code OM (unofficial)
GS1 GTIN prefix —	UNDP country code OMA	WMO country code OM	ITU callsign prefixes A4A-A4Z

== P ==
=== Pakistan ===
ISO 3166-1 numeric 586	ISO 3166-1 alpha-3 PAK	ISO 3166-1 alpha-2 PK	ICAO airport code prefix OP
E.164 code 92	IOC country code PAK	Country code top-level domain.pk	ICAO aircraft regis. prefix AP-
E.212 mobile country code 410	NATO three-letter code PAK	NATO two-letter code PK	LOC MARC code PK
ITU Maritime ID 463	ITU letter code PAK	FIPS country code PK	License plate code PK
GS1 GTIN prefix 896	UNDP country code PAK	WMO country code PK	ITU callsign prefixes 6PA-6SZ, APA-ASZ

=== Palau ===
ISO 3166-1 numeric 585	ISO 3166-1 alpha-3 PLW	ISO 3166-1 alpha-2 PW	ICAO airport code prefix PT
E.164 code 680	IOC country code PLW	Country code top-level domain.pw	ICAO aircraft regis. prefix —
E.212 mobile country code 552	NATO three-letter code PLW	NATO two-letter code PS	LOC MARC code PW
ITU Maritime ID 511	ITU letter code PLW	FIPS country code PS	License plate code PAL (unofficial)
GS1 GTIN prefix —	UNDP country code TTP (Note: Formerly the Trust Territory of the Pacific Islands (1986))	WMO country code —	ITU callsign prefixes T8A-T8Z

=== Palestine (state disputed) ===
In cases with two codes listed, the first one applies to the Gaza Strip, the second code to the West Bank.

ISO 3166-1 numeric 275	ISO 3166-1 alpha-3 PSE	ISO 3166-1 alpha-2 PS	ICAO airport code prefix LV, OJ
E.164 code 970	IOC country code PLE	Country code top-level domain.ps	ICAO aircraft regis. prefix —
E.212 mobile country code —	NATO three-letter code PSE	NATO two-letter code PS (Note: This NATO country code appears in the 9th edition and is also assigned to Palau)	LOC MARC code GZ, WJ
ITU Maritime ID 443	ITU letter code XGZ, XWB	FIPS country code GZ, WE	License plate code PS (unofficial)
GS1 GTIN prefix —	UNDP country code PAL	WMO country code —	ITU callsign prefixes E4A-E4Z

=== Panama ===
ISO 3166-1 numeric 591	ISO 3166-1 alpha-3 PAN	ISO 3166-1 alpha-2 PA	ICAO airport code prefix MP
E.164 code 507	IOC country code PAN	Country code top-level domain.pa	ICAO aircraft regis. prefix HP-
E.212 mobile country code 714	NATO three-letter code PAN	NATO two-letter code PM	LOC MARC code PN
ITU Maritime ID 351-357	ITU letter code PNR	FIPS country code PM	License plate code PA
GS1 GTIN prefix 745	UNDP country code PAN	WMO country code PM	ITU callsign prefixes 3EA-3FZ, H3A-H3Z; H8A-H9Z, HOA-HPZ

=== Papua New Guinea ===
ISO 3166-1 numeric 598	ISO 3166-1 alpha-3 PNG	ISO 3166-1 alpha-2 PG	ICAO airport code prefix AY
E.164 code 675	IOC country code PNG	Country code top-level domain.pg	ICAO aircraft regis. prefix P2-
E.212 mobile country code 537	NATO three-letter code PNG	NATO two-letter code PP	LOC MARC code PP
ITU Maritime ID 553	ITU letter code PNG	FIPS country code PP	License plate code PNG
GS1 GTIN prefix —	UNDP country code PNG	WMO country code NG	ITU callsign prefixes P2A-P2Z

=== Paraguay ===
ISO 3166-1 numeric 600	ISO 3166-1 alpha-3 PRY	ISO 3166-1 alpha-2 PY	ICAO airport code prefix SG
E.164 code 595	IOC country code PAR	Country code top-level domain.py	ICAO aircraft regis. prefix ZP-
E.212 mobile country code 744	NATO three-letter code PRY	NATO two-letter code PA	LOC MARC code PY
ITU Maritime ID 755	ITU letter code PRG	FIPS country code PA	License plate code PY
GS1 GTIN prefix 784	UNDP country code PAR	WMO country code PY	ITU callsign prefixes ZPA-ZPZ

=== Peru ===
ISO 3166-1 numeric 604	ISO 3166-1 alpha-3 PER	ISO 3166-1 alpha-2 PE	ICAO airport code prefix SP
E.164 code 51	IOC country code PER	Country code top-level domain.pe	ICAO aircraft regis. prefix OB-
E.212 mobile country code 716	NATO three-letter code PER	NATO two-letter code PE	LOC MARC code PE
ITU Maritime ID 760	ITU letter code PRU	FIPS country code PE	License plate code PE
GS1 GTIN prefix 775	UNDP country code PER	WMO country code PR	ITU callsign prefixes 4TA-4TZ, OAA-OCZ

=== Philippines ===
ISO 3166-1 numeric 608	ISO 3166-1 alpha-3 PHL	ISO 3166-1 alpha-2 PH	ICAO airport code prefix RP
E.164 code 63	IOC country code PHI	Country code top-level domain.ph	ICAO aircraft regis. prefix RP-
E.212 mobile country code 515	NATO three-letter code PHL	NATO two-letter code RP	LOC MARC code PH
ITU Maritime ID 548	ITU letter code PHL	FIPS country code RP	License plate code RP
GS1 GTIN prefix 480	UNDP country code PHI	WMO country code PH	ITU callsign prefixes 4DA-4IZ, DUA-DZZ

=== Pitcairn Islands (territory of the UK) ===
ISO 3166-1 numeric 612	ISO 3166-1 alpha-3 PCN	ISO 3166-1 alpha-2 PN	ICAO airport code prefix —
E.164 code 64	IOC country code —	Country code top-level domain.pn	ICAO aircraft regis. prefix G-
E.212 mobile country code —	NATO three-letter code PCN	NATO two-letter code PC	LOC MARC code PC
ITU Maritime ID 555	ITU letter code PTC	FIPS country code PC	License plate code —
GS1 GTIN prefix —	UNDP country code —	WMO country code PT	ITU callsign prefixes —

=== Poland ===
ISO 3166-1 numeric 616	ISO 3166-1 alpha-3 POL	ISO 3166-1 alpha-2 PL	ICAO airport code prefix EP
E.164 code 48	IOC country code POL	Country code top-level domain.pl	ICAO aircraft regis. prefix SP-
E.212 mobile country code 260	NATO three-letter code POL	NATO two-letter code PL	LOC MARC code PL
ITU Maritime ID 261	ITU letter code POL	FIPS country code PL	License plate code PL
GS1 GTIN prefix 590	UNDP country code POL	WMO country code PL	ITU callsign prefixes 3ZA-3ZZ, HFA-HFZ, SNA-SRZ

=== Portugal ===
ISO 3166-1 numeric 620	ISO 3166-1 alpha-3 PRT	ISO 3166-1 alpha-2 PT	ICAO airport code prefix LP
E.164 code 351	IOC country code POR	Country code top-level domain.pt	ICAO aircraft regis. prefix CR-, CS-
E.212 mobile country code 268	NATO three-letter code PRT	NATO two-letter code PO	LOC MARC code PO
ITU Maritime ID 263	ITU letter code POR	FIPS country code PO	License plate code P
GS1 GTIN prefix 560	UNDP country code POR	WMO country code PO	ITU callsign prefixes CQA-CUZ

=== Puerto Rico (territory of the US) ===
ISO 3166-1 numeric 630	ISO 3166-1 alpha-3 PRI	ISO 3166-1 alpha-2 PR	ICAO airport code prefix TJ
E.164 code 1	IOC country code PUR	Country code top-level domain.pr	ICAO aircraft regis. prefix N-
E.212 mobile country code 330	NATO three-letter code PRI	NATO two-letter code RQ	LOC MARC code PR
ITU Maritime ID 358	ITU letter code PTR	FIPS country code RQ	License plate code PR
GS1 GTIN prefix —	UNDP country code PUE	WMO country code PU	ITU callsign prefixes —

== Q ==
=== Qatar ===
ISO 3166-1 numeric 634	ISO 3166-1 alpha-3 QAT	ISO 3166-1 alpha-2 QA	ICAO airport code prefix OT
E.164 code 974	IOC country code QAT	Country code top-level domain.qa	ICAO aircraft regis. prefix A7-
E.212 mobile country code 427	NATO three-letter code QAT	NATO two-letter code QA	LOC MARC code QA
ITU Maritime ID 466	ITU letter code QAT	FIPS country code QA	License plate code Q
GS1 GTIN prefix —	UNDP country code QAT	WMO country code QT	ITU callsign prefixes A7A-A7Z

== R ==
=== Réunion (department of France) ===
ISO 3166-1 numeric 638	ISO 3166-1 alpha-3 REU	ISO 3166-1 alpha-2 RE	ICAO airport code prefix FME
E.164 code 262	IOC country code —	Country code top-level domain.re	ICAO aircraft regis. prefix F-
E.212 mobile country code 647	NATO three-letter code REU	NATO two-letter code RE	LOC MARC code RE
ITU Maritime ID 660	ITU letter code REU	FIPS country code RE	License plate code F
GS1 GTIN prefix —	UNDP country code REU	WMO country code RE	ITU callsign prefixes —

=== Romania ===
ISO 3166-1 numeric 642	ISO 3166-1 alpha-3 ROU	ISO 3166-1 alpha-2 RO	ICAO airport code prefix LR
E.164 code 40	IOC country code ROU	Country code top-level domain.ro	ICAO aircraft regis. prefix YR-
E.212 mobile country code 226	NATO three-letter code ROU	NATO two-letter code RO	LOC MARC code RM
ITU Maritime ID 264	ITU letter code ROU	FIPS country code RO	License plate code RO
GS1 GTIN prefix 594	UNDP country code ROM	WMO country code RO	ITU callsign prefixes YOA-YRZ

=== Russia ===
ISO 3166-1 numeric 643	ISO 3166-1 alpha-3 RUS	ISO 3166-1 alpha-2 RU	ICAO airport code prefix UE, UH, UI, UL, UN; UO, UR, US, UU, UW
E.164 code 7	IOC country code RUS	Country code top-level domain.ru	ICAO aircraft regis. prefix RA-
E.212 mobile country code 250	NATO three-letter code RUS	NATO two-letter code RS	LOC MARC code RU
ITU Maritime ID 273	ITU letter code RUS	FIPS country code RS	License plate code RUS
GS1 GTIN prefix 460-469	UNDP country code RUS	WMO country code RA, RS	ITU callsign prefixes RAA-RZZ, UAA-UIZ

=== Rwanda ===
ISO 3166-1 numeric 646	ISO 3166-1 alpha-3 RWA	ISO 3166-1 alpha-2 RW	ICAO airport code prefix HR
E.164 code 250	IOC country code RWA	Country code top-level domain.rw	ICAO aircraft regis. prefix 9XR-
E.212 mobile country code 635	NATO three-letter code RWA	NATO two-letter code RW	LOC MARC code RW
ITU Maritime ID 661	ITU letter code RRW	FIPS country code RW	License plate code RWA
GS1 GTIN prefix —	UNDP country code RWA	WMO country code RW	ITU callsign prefixes 9XA-9XZ

== S ==
=== Saint Barthélemy (collectivity of France) ===
ISO 3166-1 numeric 652	ISO 3166-1 alpha-3 BLM	ISO 3166-1 alpha-2 BL	ICAO airport code prefix TF
E.164 code 590	IOC country code —	Country code top-level domain.bl	ICAO aircraft regis. prefix —
E.212 mobile country code —	NATO three-letter code —	NATO two-letter code —	LOC MARC code SC
ITU Maritime ID —	ITU letter code —	FIPS country code TB	License plate code —
GS1 GTIN prefix —	UNDP country code —	WMO country code S2	ITU callsign prefixes —

=== Saint Helena, Ascension and Tristan da Cunha (British territory) ===
ISO 3166-1 numeric 654	ISO 3166-1 alpha-3 SHN	ISO 3166-1 alpha-2 SH	ICAO airport code prefix FH
E.164 code 290	IOC country code —	Country code top-level domain.sh	ICAO aircraft regis. prefix G-
E.212 mobile country code —	NATO three-letter code SHN	NATO two-letter code SH	LOC MARC code XJ
ITU Maritime ID 665	ITU letter code SHN	FIPS country code SH	License plate code —
GS1 GTIN prefix —	UNDP country code STH	WMO country code HE	ITU callsign prefixes —

Other:

- IIGA: STH

=== Saint Kitts and Nevis ===
ISO 3166-1 numeric 659	ISO 3166-1 alpha-3 KNA	ISO 3166-1 alpha-2 KN	ICAO airport code prefix TK
E.164 code 1	IOC country code SKN	Country code top-level domain.kn	ICAO aircraft regis. prefix V4-
E.212 mobile country code 356	NATO three-letter code KNA	NATO two-letter code SC	LOC MARC code XD
ITU Maritime ID 341	ITU letter code KNA (until 2007: SCN)	FIPS country code SC	License plate code KAN (unofficial)
GS1 GTIN prefix —	UNDP country code STK	WMO country code AT	ITU callsign prefixes V4A-V4Z

=== Saint Lucia ===
ISO 3166-1 numeric 662	ISO 3166-1 alpha-3 LCA	ISO 3166-1 alpha-2 LC	ICAO airport code prefix TL
E.164 code 1	IOC country code LCA	Country code top-level domain.lc	ICAO aircraft regis. prefix J6-
E.212 mobile country code 358	NATO three-letter code LCA	NATO two-letter code ST	LOC MARC code XK
ITU Maritime ID 343	ITU letter code LCA	FIPS country code ST	License plate code WL
GS1 GTIN prefix —	UNDP country code STL	WMO country code LC	ITU callsign prefixes J6A-J6Z

=== Saint Martin (collectivity of France) ===
ISO 3166-1 numeric 663	ISO 3166-1 alpha-3 MAF	ISO 3166-1 alpha-2 MF	ICAO airport code prefix TF
E.164 code 590	IOC country code —	Country code top-level domain.mf	ICAO aircraft regis. prefix —
E.212 mobile country code —	NATO three-letter code —	NATO two-letter code —	LOC MARC code ST
ITU Maritime ID —	ITU letter code —	FIPS country code RN	License plate code F
GS1 GTIN prefix —	UNDP country code —	WMO country code —	ITU callsign prefixes —

Other:

- CONCACAF: SMN

=== Saint Pierre and Miquelon (collectivity of France) ===
ISO 3166-1 numeric 666	ISO 3166-1 alpha-3 SPM	ISO 3166-1 alpha-2 PM	ICAO airport code prefix LF
E.164 code 508	IOC country code —	Country code top-level domain.pm	ICAO aircraft regis. prefix F-
E.212 mobile country code 308	NATO three-letter code SPM	NATO two-letter code SB (Note: The 9th edition assigns the code to Serbia and Montenegro as well)	LOC MARC code XL
ITU Maritime ID 361	ITU letter code SPM	FIPS country code SB	License plate code F
GS1 GTIN prefix —	UNDP country code FOS (?) (Note: French Overseas Territories)	WMO country code FP	ITU callsign prefixes —

=== Saint Vincent and the Grenadines ===
ISO 3166-1 numeric 670	ISO 3166-1 alpha-3 VCT	ISO 3166-1 alpha-2 VC	ICAO airport code prefix TV
E.164 code 1	IOC country code VIN	Country code top-level domain.vc	ICAO aircraft regis. prefix J8-
E.212 mobile country code 360	NATO three-letter code VCT	NATO two-letter code VC	LOC MARC code XM
ITU Maritime ID 375, 376, 377	ITU letter code VCT	FIPS country code VC	License plate code WV
GS1 GTIN prefix —	UNDP country code STV	WMO country code VG	ITU callsign prefixes J8A-J8Z

=== Samoa ===
ISO 3166-1 numeric 882	ISO 3166-1 alpha-3 WSM	ISO 3166-1 alpha-2 WS	ICAO airport code prefix NS
E.164 code 685	IOC country code SAM	Country code top-level domain.ws	ICAO aircraft regis. prefix 5W-
E.212 mobile country code 549	NATO three-letter code WSM	NATO two-letter code SS^{†}	LOC MARC code WS
ITU Maritime ID 561	ITU letter code SMO	FIPS country code WS	License plate code WS
GS1 GTIN prefix —	UNDP country code SAM	WMO country code ZM	ITU callsign prefixes 5WA-5WZ

^{†} The code is also assigned to American Samoa

=== San Marino ===
ISO 3166-1 numeric 674	ISO 3166-1 alpha-3 SMR	ISO 3166-1 alpha-2 SM	ICAO airport code prefix —
E.164 code 378	IOC country code SMR	Country code top-level domain.sm	ICAO aircraft regis. prefix T7-
E.212 mobile country code 292	NATO three-letter code SMR	NATO two-letter code SM	LOC MARC code SM
ITU Maritime ID 268	ITU letter code SMR	FIPS country code SM	License plate code RSM
GS1 GTIN prefix —	UNDP country code SNM	WMO country code —	ITU callsign prefixes T7A-T7Z

=== São Tomé and Príncipe ===
ISO 3166-1 numeric 678	ISO 3166-1 alpha-3 STP	ISO 3166-1 alpha-2 ST	ICAO airport code prefix FP
E.164 code 239	IOC country code STP	Country code top-level domain.st	ICAO aircraft regis. prefix S9-
E.212 mobile country code 626	NATO three-letter code STP	NATO two-letter code TP	LOC MARC code SF
ITU Maritime ID 668	ITU letter code STP	FIPS country code TP	License plate code STP (unofficial)
GS1 GTIN prefix —	UNDP country code STP	WMO country code TP	ITU callsign prefixes S9A-S9Z

=== Sark (part of Guernsey) ===
ISO 3166-1 numeric —	ISO 3166-1 alpha-3 CRQ (reserved)	ISO 3166-1 alpha-2 CQ (reserved)	ICAO airport code prefix —
E.164 code 44	IOC country code —	Country code top-level domain —	ICAO aircraft regis. prefix —
E.212 mobile country code —	NATO three-letter code —	NATO two-letter code —	LOC MARC code —
ITU Maritime ID —	ITU letter code —	FIPS country code —	License plate code —
GS1 GTIN prefix —	UNDP country code —	WMO country code —	ITU callsign prefixes —

Other:

- IIGA: SAR

=== Saudi Arabia ===
ISO 3166-1 numeric 682	ISO 3166-1 alpha-3 SAU	ISO 3166-1 alpha-2 SA	ICAO airport code prefix OE
E.164 code 966	IOC country code KSA	Country code top-level domain.sa	ICAO aircraft regis. prefix HZ-
E.212 mobile country code 420	NATO three-letter code SAU	NATO two-letter code SA	LOC MARC code SU
ITU Maritime ID 403	ITU letter code ARS	FIPS country code SA	License plate code KSA
GS1 GTIN prefix 628	UNDP country code SAU	WMO country code SD	ITU callsign prefixes 7ZA-7ZZ, 8ZA-8ZZ, HZA-HZZ

=== Senegal ===
ISO 3166-1 numeric 686	ISO 3166-1 alpha-3 SEN	ISO 3166-1 alpha-2 SN	ICAO airport code prefix GO
E.164 code 221	IOC country code SEN	Country code top-level domain.sn	ICAO aircraft regis. prefix 6V-, 6W-
E.212 mobile country code 608	NATO three-letter code SEN	NATO two-letter code SG	LOC MARC code SG
ITU Maritime ID 663	ITU letter code SEN	FIPS country code SG	License plate code SN
GS1 GTIN prefix 604	UNDP country code SEN	WMO country code SG	ITU callsign prefixes 6VA-6WZ

=== Serbia ===
ISO 3166-1 numeric 688	ISO 3166-1 alpha-3 SRB	ISO 3166-1 alpha-2 RS	ICAO airport code prefix LY
E.164 code 381	IOC country code SRB	Country code top-level domain.rs	ICAO aircraft regis. prefix YU-
E.212 mobile country code 220	NATO three-letter code SRB	NATO two-letter code RS	LOC MARC code RB
ITU Maritime ID 279	ITU letter code SRB	FIPS country code RI	License plate code SRB
GS1 GTIN prefix 860	UNDP country code YUG (Note: Taken over from Yugoslavia)	WMO country code RB	ITU callsign prefixes YTA-YUZ

=== Seychelles ===
ISO 3166-1 numeric 690	ISO 3166-1 alpha-3 SYC	ISO 3166-1 alpha-2 SC	ICAO airport code prefix FS
E.164 code 248	IOC country code SEY	Country code top-level domain.sc	ICAO aircraft regis. prefix S7-
E.212 mobile country code 633	NATO three-letter code SYC	NATO two-letter code SE	LOC MARC code SE
ITU Maritime ID 664	ITU letter code SEY	FIPS country code SE	License plate code SY
GS1 GTIN prefix —	UNDP country code SEY	WMO country code SC	ITU callsign prefixes S7A-S7Z

=== Sierra Leone ===
ISO 3166-1 numeric 694	ISO 3166-1 alpha-3 SLE	ISO 3166-1 alpha-2 SL	ICAO airport code prefix GF
E.164 code 232	IOC country code SLE	Country code top-level domain.sl	ICAO aircraft regis. prefix 9L-
E.212 mobile country code 619	NATO three-letter code SLE	NATO two-letter code SL	LOC MARC code SL
ITU Maritime ID 667	ITU letter code SRL	FIPS country code SL	License plate code WAL
GS1 GTIN prefix —	UNDP country code SIL	WMO country code SL	ITU callsign prefixes 9LA-9LZ

=== Singapore ===
ISO 3166-1 numeric 702	ISO 3166-1 alpha-3 SGP	ISO 3166-1 alpha-2 SG	ICAO airport code prefix WS
E.164 code 65	IOC country code SGP	Country code top-level domain.sg	ICAO aircraft regis. prefix 9V-
E.212 mobile country code 525	NATO three-letter code SGP	NATO two-letter code SN	LOC MARC code SI
ITU Maritime ID 563, 564	ITU letter code SNG	FIPS country code SN	License plate code SGP
GS1 GTIN prefix 888	UNDP country code SIN	WMO country code SR	ITU callsign prefixes 9VA-9VZ, S6A-S6Z

=== Sint Maarten (Kingdom of the Netherlands) ===
ISO 3166-1 numeric 534	ISO 3166-1 alpha-3 SXM	ISO 3166-1 alpha-2 SX	ICAO airport code prefix TN
E.164 code 1	IOC country code —	Country code top-level domain.sx	ICAO aircraft regis. prefix —
E.212 mobile country code —	NATO three-letter code —	NATO two-letter code —	LOC MARC code SN
ITU Maritime ID —	ITU letter code —	FIPS country code NN	License plate code —
GS1 GTIN prefix —	UNDP country code —	WMO country code —	ITU callsign prefixes PJA-PJZ

Other:

- CONCACAF: SMA

=== Slovakia ===
ISO 3166-1 numeric 703	ISO 3166-1 alpha-3 SVK	ISO 3166-1 alpha-2 SK	ICAO airport code prefix LZ
E.164 code 421	IOC country code SVK	Country code top-level domain.sk	ICAO aircraft regis. prefix OM-
E.212 mobile country code 231	NATO three-letter code SVK	NATO two-letter code LO	LOC MARC code XO
ITU Maritime ID 267	ITU letter code SVK	FIPS country code LO	License plate code SK
GS1 GTIN prefix 858	UNDP country code SLO	WMO country code SQ	ITU callsign prefixes OMA-OMZ

=== Slovenia ===
ISO 3166-1 numeric 705	ISO 3166-1 alpha-3 SVN	ISO 3166-1 alpha-2 SI	ICAO airport code prefix LJ
E.164 code 386	IOC country code SLO	Country code top-level domain.si	ICAO aircraft regis. prefix S5-
E.212 mobile country code 293	NATO three-letter code SVN	NATO two-letter code SI	LOC MARC code XV
ITU Maritime ID 278	ITU letter code SVN	FIPS country code SI	License plate code SLO
GS1 GTIN prefix 383	UNDP country code SVN	WMO country code LJ	ITU callsign prefixes S5A-S5Z

=== Solomon Islands ===
ISO 3166-1 numeric 090	ISO 3166-1 alpha-3 SLB	ISO 3166-1 alpha-2 SB	ICAO airport code prefix AG
E.164 code 677	IOC country code SOL	Country code top-level domain.sb	ICAO aircraft regis. prefix H4-
E.212 mobile country code 540	NATO three-letter code SLB	NATO two-letter code BP	LOC MARC code BP
ITU Maritime ID 557	ITU letter code SLM	FIPS country code BP	License plate code SOL (unofficial)
GS1 GTIN prefix —	UNDP country code SOI	WMO country code SO	ITU callsign prefixes H4A-H4Z

=== Somalia ===
ISO 3166-1 numeric 706	ISO 3166-1 alpha-3 SOM	ISO 3166-1 alpha-2 SO	ICAO airport code prefix HC
E.164 code 252	IOC country code SOM	Country code top-level domain.so	ICAO aircraft regis. prefix 6O-
E.212 mobile country code 637	NATO three-letter code SOM	NATO two-letter code SO	LOC MARC code SO
ITU Maritime ID 666	ITU letter code SOM	FIPS country code SO	License plate code SO
GS1 GTIN prefix —	UNDP country code SOM	WMO country code SI	ITU callsign prefixes 6OA-6OZ, T5A-T5Z

=== South Africa ===
ISO 3166-1 numeric 710	ISO 3166-1 alpha-3 ZAF	ISO 3166-1 alpha-2 ZA	ICAO airport code prefix FA
E.164 code 27	IOC country code RSA	Country code top-level domain.za	ICAO aircraft regis. prefix ZS-, ZT-, ZU-
E.212 mobile country code 655	NATO three-letter code ZAF	NATO two-letter code SF	LOC MARC code SA
ITU Maritime ID 601	ITU letter code AFS	FIPS country code SF	License plate code ZA
GS1 GTIN prefix 600-601	UNDP country code SAF	WMO country code ZA	ITU callsign prefixes S8A-S8Z, ZRA-ZUZ

=== South Georgia and the South Sandwich Islands (UK territory) ===
ISO 3166-1 numeric 239	ISO 3166-1 alpha-3 SGS	ISO 3166-1 alpha-2 GS	ICAO airport code prefix EG
E.164 code 500	IOC country code —	Country code top-level domain.gs	ICAO aircraft regis. prefix G-
E.212 mobile country code —	NATO three-letter code SGS	NATO two-letter code SX	LOC MARC code XS
ITU Maritime ID —	ITU letter code —	FIPS country code SX	License plate code —
GS1 GTIN prefix —	UNDP country code —	WMO country code —	ITU callsign prefixes —

=== South Sudan ===
ISO 3166-1 numeric 728	ISO 3166-1 alpha-3 SSD	ISO 3166-1 alpha-2 SS	ICAO airport code prefix HS
E.164 code 211	IOC country code SSD	Country code top-level domain —	ICAO aircraft regis. prefix —
E.212 mobile country code 659	NATO three-letter code —	NATO two-letter code —	LOC MARC code SD
ITU Maritime ID —	ITU letter code —	FIPS country code OD	License plate code —
GS1 GTIN prefix —	UNDP country code —	WMO country code —	ITU callsign prefixes —

=== Spain ===
ISO 3166-1 numeric 724	ISO 3166-1 alpha-3 ESP	ISO 3166-1 alpha-2 ES	ICAO airport code prefix LE, GC, GE
E.164 code 34	IOC country code ESP	Country code top-level domain.es	ICAO aircraft regis. prefix EC-
E.212 mobile country code 214	NATO three-letter code ESP	NATO two-letter code SP	LOC MARC code SP
ITU Maritime ID 224, 225	ITU letter code E	FIPS country code SP	License plate code E
GS1 GTIN prefix 840-849	UNDP country code SPA	WMO country code SP	ITU callsign prefixes AMA-AOZ, EAA-EHZ

=== Sri Lanka ===
ISO 3166-1 numeric 144	ISO 3166-1 alpha-3 LKA	ISO 3166-1 alpha-2 LK	ICAO airport code prefix VC
E.164 code 94	IOC country code SRI	Country code top-level domain.lk	ICAO aircraft regis. prefix 4R-
E.212 mobile country code 413	NATO three-letter code LKA	NATO two-letter code C	LOC MARC code CE
ITU Maritime ID 417	ITU letter code CLN	FIPS country code CE	License plate code CL
GS1 GTIN prefix 479	UNDP country code SRL	WMO country code SB	ITU callsign prefixes 4PA-4SZ

=== Sudan ===
ISO 3166-1 numeric 736	ISO 3166-1 alpha-3 SDN	ISO 3166-1 alpha-2 SD	ICAO airport code prefix HS
E.164 code 249	IOC country code SUD	Country code top-level domain.sd	ICAO aircraft regis. prefix ST-
E.212 mobile country code 634	NATO three-letter code SDN	NATO two-letter code SU	LOC MARC code SJ
ITU Maritime ID 662	ITU letter code SDN	FIPS country code SU	License plate code SUD
GS1 GTIN prefix —	UNDP country code SUD	WMO country code SU	ITU callsign prefixes 6TA-6UZ, SSN-SSZ, STA-STZ

=== Suriname ===
ISO 3166-1 numeric 740	ISO 3166-1 alpha-3 SUR	ISO 3166-1 alpha-2 SR	ICAO airport code prefix SM
E.164 code 597	IOC country code SUR	Country code top-level domain.sr	ICAO aircraft regis. prefix PZ-
E.212 mobile country code 746	NATO three-letter code SUR	NATO two-letter code NS	LOC MARC code SR
ITU Maritime ID 765	ITU letter code SUR	FIPS country code NS	License plate code SME
GS1 GTIN prefix —	UNDP country code SUR	WMO country code SM	ITU callsign prefixes PZA-PZZ

=== Svalbard and Jan Mayen (Archipelago of Norway) ===
ISO 3166-1 numeric 744	ISO 3166-1 alpha-3 SJM	ISO 3166-1 alpha-2 SJ	ICAO airport code prefix —
E.164 code 47	IOC country code —	Country code top-level domain.sj	ICAO aircraft regis. prefix LN-
E.212 mobile country code 242	NATO three-letter code SJM	NATO two-letter code SV	LOC MARC code —
ITU Maritime ID —	ITU letter code —	FIPS country code SV, JN	License plate code —
GS1 GTIN prefix —	UNDP country code —	WMO country code SZ	ITU callsign prefixes —

=== Sweden ===
ISO 3166-1 numeric 752	ISO 3166-1 alpha-3 SWE	ISO 3166-1 alpha-2 SE	ICAO airport code prefix ES
E.164 code 46	IOC country code SWE	Country code top-level domain.se	ICAO aircraft regis. prefix SE-
E.212 mobile country code 240	NATO three-letter code SWE	NATO two-letter code SW	LOC MARC code SW
ITU Maritime ID 265, 266	ITU letter code S	FIPS country code SW	License plate code S
GS1 GTIN prefix 730-739	UNDP country code SWE	WMO country code SN	ITU callsign prefixes 7SA-7SZ,8SA-8SZ, SAA-SMZ

=== Switzerland ===
ISO 3166-1 numeric 756	ISO 3166-1 alpha-3 CHE	ISO 3166-1 alpha-2 CH	ICAO airport code prefix LS
E.164 code 41	IOC country code SUI	Country code top-level domain.ch	ICAO aircraft regis. prefix HB-
E.212 mobile country code 228	NATO three-letter code CHE	NATO two-letter code SZ	LOC MARC code SZ
ITU Maritime ID 269	ITU letter code SUI	FIPS country code SZ	License plate code CH
GS1 GTIN prefix 760-769	UNDP country code SWI	WMO country code SW	ITU callsign prefixes HBA-HBZ, HEA-HEZ

=== Syria ===
ISO 3166-1 numeric 760	ISO 3166-1 alpha-3 SYR	ISO 3166-1 alpha-2 SY	ICAO airport code prefix OS
E.164 code 963	IOC country code SYR	Country code top-level domain.sy	ICAO aircraft regis. prefix YK-
E.212 mobile country code 417	NATO three-letter code SYR	NATO two-letter code SY	LOC MARC code SY
ITU Maritime ID 468	ITU letter code SYR	FIPS country code SY	License plate code SYR
GS1 GTIN prefix 621	UNDP country code SYR	WMO country code SY	ITU callsign prefixes 6CA-6CZ, YKA-YKZ

== T ==
=== Taiwan ===
ISO 3166-1 numeric 158	ISO 3166-1 alpha-3 TWN	ISO 3166-1 alpha-2 TW	ICAO airport code prefix RC
E.164 code 886	IOC country code TPE	Country code top-level domain.tw	ICAO aircraft regis. prefix B- rear end：Five Numbcode (English letters/International Numbers)
E.212 mobile country code 466	NATO three-letter code TWN	NATO two-letter code TW	LOC MARC code CH
ITU Maritime ID 416	ITU letter code TWN	FIPS country code TW	License plate code RC
GS1 GTIN prefix 471	UNDP country code TWN	WMO country code TW	ITU callsign prefixes B (BM-BQ, BU-BX)

=== Tajikistan ===
ISO 3166-1 numeric 762	ISO 3166-1 alpha-3 TJK	ISO 3166-1 alpha-2 TJ	ICAO airport code prefix UT
E.164 code 992	IOC country code TJK	Country code top-level domain.tj	ICAO aircraft regis. prefix EY-
E.212 mobile country code 436	NATO three-letter code TJK	NATO two-letter code TI	LOC MARC code TA
ITU Maritime ID —	ITU letter code TJK	FIPS country code TI	License plate code TJ
GS1 GTIN prefix 488	UNDP country code TAJ	WMO country code TZ	ITU callsign prefixes EYA-EYZ

=== Tanzania ===
ISO 3166-1 numeric 834	ISO 3166-1 alpha-3 TZA	ISO 3166-1 alpha-2 TZ	ICAO airport code prefix HT
E.164 code 255	IOC country code TAN	Country code top-level domain.tz	ICAO aircraft regis. prefix 5H-
E.212 mobile country code 640	NATO three-letter code TZA	NATO two-letter code TZ	LOC MARC code TZ
ITU Maritime ID 674, 677	ITU letter code TZA	FIPS country code TZ	License plate code EAT
GS1 GTIN prefix 620	UNDP country code URT (Note: United Republic of Tanzania)	WMO country code TN	ITU callsign prefixes 5HA-5IZ

=== Thailand ===
ISO 3166-1 numeric 764	ISO 3166-1 alpha-3 THA	ISO 3166-1 alpha-2 TH	ICAO airport code prefix VT
E.164 code 66	IOC country code THA	Country code top-level domain.th	ICAO aircraft regis. prefix HS-
E.212 mobile country code 520	NATO three-letter code THA	NATO two-letter code TH	LOC MARC code TH
ITU Maritime ID 567	ITU letter code THA	FIPS country code TH	License plate code T
GS1 GTIN prefix 885	UNDP country code THA	WMO country code TH	ITU callsign prefixes E2A-E2Z, HSA-HSZ

=== Timor-Leste ===
ISO 3166-1 numeric 626	ISO 3166-1 alpha-3 TLS	ISO 3166-1 alpha-2 TL	ICAO airport code prefix WP
E.164 code 670	IOC country code TLS	Country code top-level domain.tl	ICAO aircraft regis. prefix —
E.212 mobile country code 514	NATO three-letter code TLS	NATO two-letter code TM	LOC MARC code EM
ITU Maritime ID —	ITU letter code TLS	FIPS country code TT	License plate code TL (unofficial)
GS1 GTIN prefix —	UNDP country code TIM	WMO country code TM	ITU callsign prefixes 4WA-4WZ

=== Togo ===
ISO 3166-1 numeric 768	ISO 3166-1 alpha-3 TGO	ISO 3166-1 alpha-2 TG	ICAO airport code prefix DX
E.164 code 228	IOC country code TOG	Country code top-level domain.tg	ICAO aircraft regis. prefix 5V-
E.212 mobile country code 615	NATO three-letter code TGO	NATO two-letter code TO	LOC MARC code TG
ITU Maritime ID 671	ITU letter code TGO	FIPS country code TO	License plate code TG
GS1 GTIN prefix —	UNDP country code TOG	WMO country code TG	ITU callsign prefixes 5VA-5VZ

=== Tokelau (division of New Zealand) ===
ISO 3166-1 numeric 772	ISO 3166-1 alpha-3 TKL	ISO 3166-1 alpha-2 TK	ICAO airport code prefix —
E.164 code 690	IOC country code —	Country code top-level domain.tk	ICAO aircraft regis. prefix ZK-
E.212 mobile country code 530	NATO three-letter code TKL	NATO two-letter code TL	LOC MARC code TL
ITU Maritime ID —	ITU letter code TKL	FIPS country code TL	License plate code —
GS1 GTIN prefix —	UNDP country code TOK	WMO country code TK	ITU callsign prefixes —

=== Tonga ===
ISO 3166-1 numeric 776	ISO 3166-1 alpha-3 TON	ISO 3166-1 alpha-2 TO	ICAO airport code prefix NFT
E.164 code 676	IOC country code TGA	Country code top-level domain.to	ICAO aircraft regis. prefix A3-
E.212 mobile country code 539	NATO three-letter code TON	NATO two-letter code TN	LOC MARC code TO
ITU Maritime ID 570	ITU letter code TON	FIPS country code TN	License plate code TO (unofficial)
GS1 GTIN prefix —	UNDP country code TON	WMO country code TO	ITU callsign prefixes A3A-A3Z

=== Trinidad and Tobago ===
ISO 3166-1 numeric 780	ISO 3166-1 alpha-3 TTO	ISO 3166-1 alpha-2 TT	ICAO airport code prefix TT
E.164 code 1	IOC country code TTO	Country code top-level domain.tt	ICAO aircraft regis. prefix 9Y-
E.212 mobile country code 374	NATO three-letter code TTO	NATO two-letter code TD	LOC MARC code TR
ITU Maritime ID 362	ITU letter code TRD	FIPS country code TD	License plate code TT
GS1 GTIN prefix —	UNDP country code TRI	WMO country code TD	ITU callsign prefixes 9YA-9ZZ

=== Tunisia ===
ISO 3166-1 numeric 788	ISO 3166-1 alpha-3 TUN	ISO 3166-1 alpha-2 TN	ICAO airport code prefix DT
E.164 code 216	IOC country code TUN	Country code top-level domain.tn	ICAO aircraft regis. prefix TS-
E.212 mobile country code 605	NATO three-letter code TUN	NATO two-letter code TS	LOC MARC code TI
ITU Maritime ID 672	ITU letter code TUN	FIPS country code TS	License plate code TN
GS1 GTIN prefix 619	UNDP country code TUN	WMO country code TS	ITU callsign prefixes 3VA-3VZ, TSA-TSZ

=== Turkey ===
ISO 3166-1 numeric 792	ISO 3166-1 alpha-3 TUR	ISO 3166-1 alpha-2 TR	ICAO airport code prefix LT
E.164 code 90	IOC country code TUR	Country code top-level domain.tr	ICAO aircraft regis. prefix TC-
E.212 mobile country code 286	NATO three-letter code TUR	NATO two-letter code TU	LOC MARC code TU
ITU Maritime ID 271	ITU letter code TUR	FIPS country code TU	License plate code TR
GS1 GTIN prefix 868-869	UNDP country code TUR	WMO country code TU	ITU callsign prefixes TAA-TCZ, YMA-YMZ

=== Turkmenistan ===
ISO 3166-1 numeric 795	ISO 3166-1 alpha-3 TKM	ISO 3166-1 alpha-2 TM	ICAO airport code prefix UT
E.164 code 993	IOC country code TKM	Country code top-level domain.tm	ICAO aircraft regis. prefix EZ-
E.212 mobile country code 438	NATO three-letter code TKM	NATO two-letter code TX	LOC MARC code TK
ITU Maritime ID 434	ITU letter code TKM	FIPS country code TX	License plate code TM
GS1 GTIN prefix 483	UNDP country code TUK	WMO country code TR	ITU callsign prefixes EZA-EZZ

=== Turks and Caicos Islands ===
ISO 3166-1 numeric 796	ISO 3166-1 alpha-3 TCA	ISO 3166-1 alpha-2 TC	ICAO airport code prefix MB
E.164 code 1	IOC country code —	Country code top-level domain.tc	ICAO aircraft regis. prefix VQ-T-
E.212 mobile country code 376	NATO three-letter code TCA	NATO two-letter code TK	LOC MARC code TC
ITU Maritime ID 364	ITU letter code TCA	FIPS country code TK	License plate code —
GS1 GTIN prefix —	UNDP country code TCI	WMO country code TI	ITU callsign prefixes —

=== Tuvalu ===
ISO 3166-1 numeric 798	ISO 3166-1 alpha-3 TUV	ISO 3166-1 alpha-2 TV	ICAO airport code prefix NGF
E.164 code 688	IOC country code TUV	Country code top-level domain.tv	ICAO aircraft regis. prefix T2-
E.212 mobile country code 553	NATO three-letter code TUV	NATO two-letter code TV	LOC MARC code TV
ITU Maritime ID 572	ITU letter code TUV	FIPS country code TV	License plate code TUV (unofficial)
GS1 GTIN prefix —	UNDP country code TUV	WMO country code TV	ITU callsign prefixes T2A-T2Z

== U ==
=== Uganda ===
ISO 3166-1 numeric 800	ISO 3166-1 alpha-3 UGA	ISO 3166-1 alpha-2 UG	ICAO airport code prefix HU
E.164 code 256	IOC country code UGA	Country code top-level domain.ug	ICAO aircraft regis. prefix 5X-
E.212 mobile country code 641	NATO three-letter code UGA	NATO two-letter code UG	LOC MARC code UG
ITU Maritime ID 675	ITU letter code UGA	FIPS country code UG	License plate code EAU
GS1 GTIN prefix —	UNDP country code UGA	WMO country code UG	ITU callsign prefixes 5XA-5XZ

=== Ukraine ===
ISO 3166-1 numeric 804	ISO 3166-1 alpha-3 UKR	ISO 3166-1 alpha-2 UA	ICAO airport code prefix UK
E.164 code 380	IOC country code UKR	Country code top-level domain.ua	ICAO aircraft regis. prefix UR-
E.212 mobile country code 255	NATO three-letter code UKR	NATO two-letter code UP	LOC MARC code UN
ITU Maritime ID 272	ITU letter code UKR	FIPS country code UP	License plate code UA
GS1 GTIN prefix 482	UNDP country code UKR	WMO country code UR	ITU callsign prefixes EMA-EOZ, URA-UZZ

=== United Arab Emirates ===
ISO 3166-1 numeric 784	ISO 3166-1 alpha-3 ARE	ISO 3166-1 alpha-2 AE	ICAO airport code prefix OM
E.164 code 971	IOC country code UAE	Country code top-level domain.ae	ICAO aircraft regis. prefix A6-
E.212 mobile country code 050, 051, 052, 053, 054, 056, 057, 058	NATO three-letter code ARE	NATO two-letter code TC	LOC MARC code TS
ITU Maritime ID 470	ITU letter code UAE	FIPS country code AE	License plate code UAE
GS1 GTIN prefix 629	UNDP country code UAE	WMO country code ER	ITU callsign prefixes A6A-A6Z

=== United Kingdom ===
ISO 3166-1 numeric 826	ISO 3166-1 alpha-3 GBR	ISO 3166-1 alpha-2 GB	ICAO airport code prefix EG
E.164 code 44	IOC country code GBR	Country code top-level domain.uk and .gb	ICAO aircraft regis. prefix G-
E.212 mobile country code 234, 235	NATO three-letter code GBR	NATO two-letter code UK	LOC MARC code UK
ITU Maritime ID 232-235	ITU letter code G	FIPS country code UK	License plate code UK
GS1 GTIN prefix 500-509	UNDP country code UKM	WMO country code UK	ITU callsign prefixes 2AA-2ZZ, GAA-GZZ, MAA-MZZ, VPA-VQZ; VSA-VSZ, ZBA-ZJZ, ZNA-ZOZ, ZQA-ZQZ

=== United States ===
ISO 3166-1 numeric 840	ISO 3166-1 alpha-3 USA	ISO 3166-1 alpha-2 US	ICAO airport code prefix K, PA, PB, PF, PH, PJ, PL, PM, PO, PP, PW
E.164 code 1	IOC country code USA	Country code top-level domain.us	ICAO aircraft regis. prefix N (Note: US does not put a - (dash) after the N on aircraft ex: N1A to N9999Z)
E.212 mobile country code 310-316	NATO three-letter code USA	NATO two-letter code US	LOC MARC code US
ITU Maritime ID 338, 366-369	ITU letter code USA	FIPS country code US	License plate code USA
GS1 GTIN prefix 000-139	UNDP country code USA	WMO country code US	ITU callsign prefixes AAA-ALZ, KAA-KZZ; NAA-NZZ, WAA-WZZ

=== United States Minor Outlying Islands ===
ISO 3166-1 numeric 581	ISO 3166-1 alpha-3 UMI	ISO 3166-1 alpha-2 UM	ICAO airport code prefix PB, PJ, PM, PW
E.164 code —	IOC country code —	Country code top-level domain.um (officially obsolete)	ICAO aircraft regis. prefix —
E.212 mobile country code —	NATO three-letter code UMI	NATO two-letter code IQ	LOC MARC code —
ITU Maritime ID —	ITU letter code HWL, JAR, JON, MDW, PLM, WAK	FIPS country code DQ, FQ, HQ, JQ, KQ, LQ, MQ, WQ	License plate code —
GS1 GTIN prefix —	UNDP country code UMI	WMO country code —	ITU callsign prefixes —

=== Uruguay ===
ISO 3166-1 numeric 858	ISO 3166-1 alpha-3 URY	ISO 3166-1 alpha-2 UY	ICAO airport code prefix SU
E.164 code 598	IOC country code URU	Country code top-level domain.uy	ICAO aircraft regis. prefix CX-
E.212 mobile country code 748	NATO three-letter code URY	NATO two-letter code UY	LOC MARC code UY
ITU Maritime ID 770	ITU letter code URG	FIPS country code UY	License plate code ROU
GS1 GTIN prefix 773	UNDP country code URU	WMO country code UY	ITU callsign prefixes CVA-CXZ

=== Uzbekistan ===
ISO 3166-1 numeric 860	ISO 3166-1 alpha-3 UZB	ISO 3166-1 alpha-2 UZ	ICAO airport code prefix UT
E.164 code 998	IOC country code UZB	Country code top-level domain.uz	ICAO aircraft regis. prefix UK-
E.212 mobile country code 434	NATO three-letter code UZB	NATO two-letter code UZ	LOC MARC code UZ
ITU Maritime ID —	ITU letter code UZB	FIPS country code UZ	License plate code UZ
GS1 GTIN prefix 478	UNDP country code UZB	WMO country code UZ	ITU callsign prefixes UJA-UMZ

== V ==
=== Vanuatu ===
ISO 3166-1 numeric 548	ISO 3166-1 alpha-3 VUT	ISO 3166-1 alpha-2 VU	ICAO airport code prefix NV
E.164 code 678	IOC country code VAN	Country code top-level domain.vu	ICAO aircraft regis. prefix YJ-
E.212 mobile country code 541	NATO three-letter code VUT	NATO two-letter code NH	LOC MARC code NN
ITU Maritime ID 576	ITU letter code VUT	FIPS country code NH	License plate code VU (unofficial)
GS1 GTIN prefix —	UNDP country code VAN	WMO country code NV	ITU callsign prefixes YJA-YJZ

=== Vatican City ===
ISO 3166-1 numeric 336	ISO 3166-1 alpha-3 VAT	ISO 3166-1 alpha-2 VA	ICAO airport code prefix —
E.164 code 379 (Note: Not used, instead Italian telephone numbers beginning +39 06 698 are assigned)	IOC country code —	Country code top-level domain.va	ICAO aircraft regis. prefix HV-
E.212 mobile country code 225	NATO three-letter code VAT	NATO two-letter code VT	LOC MARC code VC
ITU Maritime ID 208	ITU letter code CVA	FIPS country code VT	License plate code V
GS1 GTIN prefix —	UNDP country code HLS (Note: Holy See)	WMO country code —	ITU callsign prefixes HVA-HVZ

=== Venezuela ===
ISO 3166-1 numeric 862	ISO 3166-1 alpha-3 VEN	ISO 3166-1 alpha-2 VE	ICAO airport code prefix SV
E.164 code 58	IOC country code VEN	Country code top-level domain.ve	ICAO aircraft regis. prefix YV-
E.212 mobile country code 734	NATO three-letter code VEN	NATO two-letter code VE	LOC MARC code VE
ITU Maritime ID 775	ITU letter code VEN	FIPS country code VE	License plate code YV
GS1 GTIN prefix 759	UNDP country code VEN	WMO country code VN	ITU callsign prefixes 4MA-4MZ, YVA-YYZ

=== Vietnam ===
ISO 3166-1 numeric 704	ISO 3166-1 alpha-3 VNM	ISO 3166-1 alpha-2 VN	ICAO airport code prefix VV
E.164 code 84	IOC country code VIE	Country code top-level domain.vn	ICAO aircraft regis. prefix VN-
E.212 mobile country code 452	NATO three-letter code VNM	NATO two-letter code VN	LOC MARC code VM
ITU Maritime ID 574	ITU letter code VTN	FIPS country code VM	License plate code VN
GS1 GTIN prefix 893	UNDP country code VIE	WMO country code VS	ITU callsign prefixes 3WA-3WZ, XVA-XVZ

=== British Virgin Islands (territory of the UK) ===
ISO 3166-1 numeric 092	ISO 3166-1 alpha-3 VGB	ISO 3166-1 alpha-2 VG	ICAO airport code prefix TU
E.164 code 1	IOC country code IVB	Country code top-level domain.vg	ICAO aircraft regis. prefix VP-LV-
E.212 mobile country code 348	NATO three-letter code VGB	NATO two-letter code VS	LOC MARC code VB
ITU Maritime ID 378	ITU letter code VRG	FIPS country code VI	License plate code BVI
GS1 GTIN prefix —	UNDP country code BVI	WMO country code VG	ITU callsign prefixes —

=== United States Virgin Islands (territory of the USA) ===
ISO 3166-1 numeric 850	ISO 3166-1 alpha-3 VIR	ISO 3166-1 alpha-2 VI	ICAO airport code prefix MI, TI
E.164 code 1	IOC country code ISV	Country code top-level domain.vi	ICAO aircraft regis. prefix N-
E.212 mobile country code 332	NATO three-letter code VIR	NATO two-letter code VI	LOC MARC code VI
ITU Maritime ID 379	ITU letter code VIR	FIPS country code VQ	License plate code —
GS1 GTIN prefix —	UNDP country code UVI	WMO country code VI	ITU callsign prefixes —

== W ==
=== Wallis and Futuna (territory of France) ===
ISO 3166-1 numeric 876	ISO 3166-1 alpha-3 WLF	ISO 3166-1 alpha-2 WF	ICAO airport code prefix NL
E.164 code 681	IOC country code —	Country code top-level domain.wf	ICAO aircraft regis. prefix F-
E.212 mobile country code 543	NATO three-letter code WLF	NATO two-letter code WF	LOC MARC code WF
ITU Maritime ID 578	ITU letter code WAL	FIPS country code WF	License plate code F
GS1 GTIN prefix —	UNDP country code WFI	WMO country code FW	ITU callsign prefixes —

=== Western Sahara (disputed territory) ===
ISO 3166-1 numeric 732	ISO 3166-1 alpha-3 ESH	ISO 3166-1 alpha-2 EH	ICAO airport code prefix GS
E.164 code 212	IOC country code —	Country code top-level domain —	ICAO aircraft regis. prefix CN-
E.212 mobile country code 604	NATO three-letter code ESH	NATO two-letter code WI	LOC MARC code SS
ITU Maritime ID —	ITU letter code AOE	FIPS country code WI	License plate code ME(?)
GS1 GTIN prefix —	UNDP country code SAH	WMO country code EH	ITU callsign prefixes —

== Y ==
=== Yemen ===
ISO 3166-1 numeric 887	ISO 3166-1 alpha-3 YEM	ISO 3166-1 alpha-2 YE	ICAO airport code prefix OY
E.164 code 967	IOC country code YEM	Country code top-level domain.ye	ICAO aircraft regis. prefix 7O-
E.212 mobile country code 421	NATO three-letter code YEM	NATO two-letter code YE	LOC MARC code YE
ITU Maritime ID 473, 475	ITU letter code YEM	FIPS country code YM	License plate code YEM
GS1 GTIN prefix —	UNDP country code YEM	WMO country code YE	ITU callsign prefixes 7OA-7OZ

== Z ==
=== Zambia ===
ISO 3166-1 numeric 894	ISO 3166-1 alpha-3 ZMB	ISO 3166-1 alpha-2 ZM	ICAO airport code prefix FL
E.164 code 260	IOC country code ZAM	Country code top-level domain.zm	ICAO aircraft regis. prefix 9J-
E.212 mobile country code 645	NATO three-letter code ZMB	NATO two-letter code ZA	LOC MARC code ZA
ITU Maritime ID 678	ITU letter code ZMB	FIPS country code ZA	License plate code ZM
GS1 GTIN prefix —	UNDP country code ZAM	WMO country code ZB	ITU callsign prefixes 9IA-9JZ

=== Zimbabwe ===
ISO 3166-1 numeric 716	ISO 3166-1 alpha-3 ZWE	ISO 3166-1 alpha-2 ZW	ICAO airport code prefix FV
E.164 code 263	IOC country code ZIM	Country code top-level domain.zw	ICAO aircraft regis. prefix Z-
E.212 mobile country code 648	NATO three-letter code ZWE	NATO two-letter code ZI	LOC MARC code RH
ITU Maritime ID 679	ITU letter code ZWE	FIPS country code ZI	License plate code ZW
GS1 GTIN prefix —	UNDP country code ZIM	WMO country code ZW	ITU callsign prefixes Z2A-Z2Z
