= Automatic Transmitter Identification System =

Automatic Transmitter Identification System (ATIS) can refer to:

- Automatic Transmitter Identification System (marine), for VHF radios operating on European inland waterways
- Automatic Transmitter Identification System (television), used with satellite television broadcasts
