= HWL =

HWL could refer to:

- Hartwell railway station, Melbourne, Australia; station code HWL.
- Hawaii Winter League baseball
- Horst-Wessel-Lied
- Howland Island; ITU letter code HWL.
- Hutchison Whampoa Ltd.
- High Water Line
