= Two-letter country codes =

Two-letter country codes, often widely used yet sometimes poorly recognized, represent countries and states.

- The ISO 3166-1 standard includes the main set of two-letter country codes in ISO 3166-1 alpha-2 (it also includes three-letter codes in ISO 3166-1 alpha-3).
- Until September 2, 2008, the Federal Information Processing Standards of the United States maintained a separate set of two-letter country codes.
- Many countries are assigned two-letter codes for international vehicle registration, but some use one-letter or three-letter codes.
