= Automatic Transmitter Identification System (marine) =

Marine VHF radio system

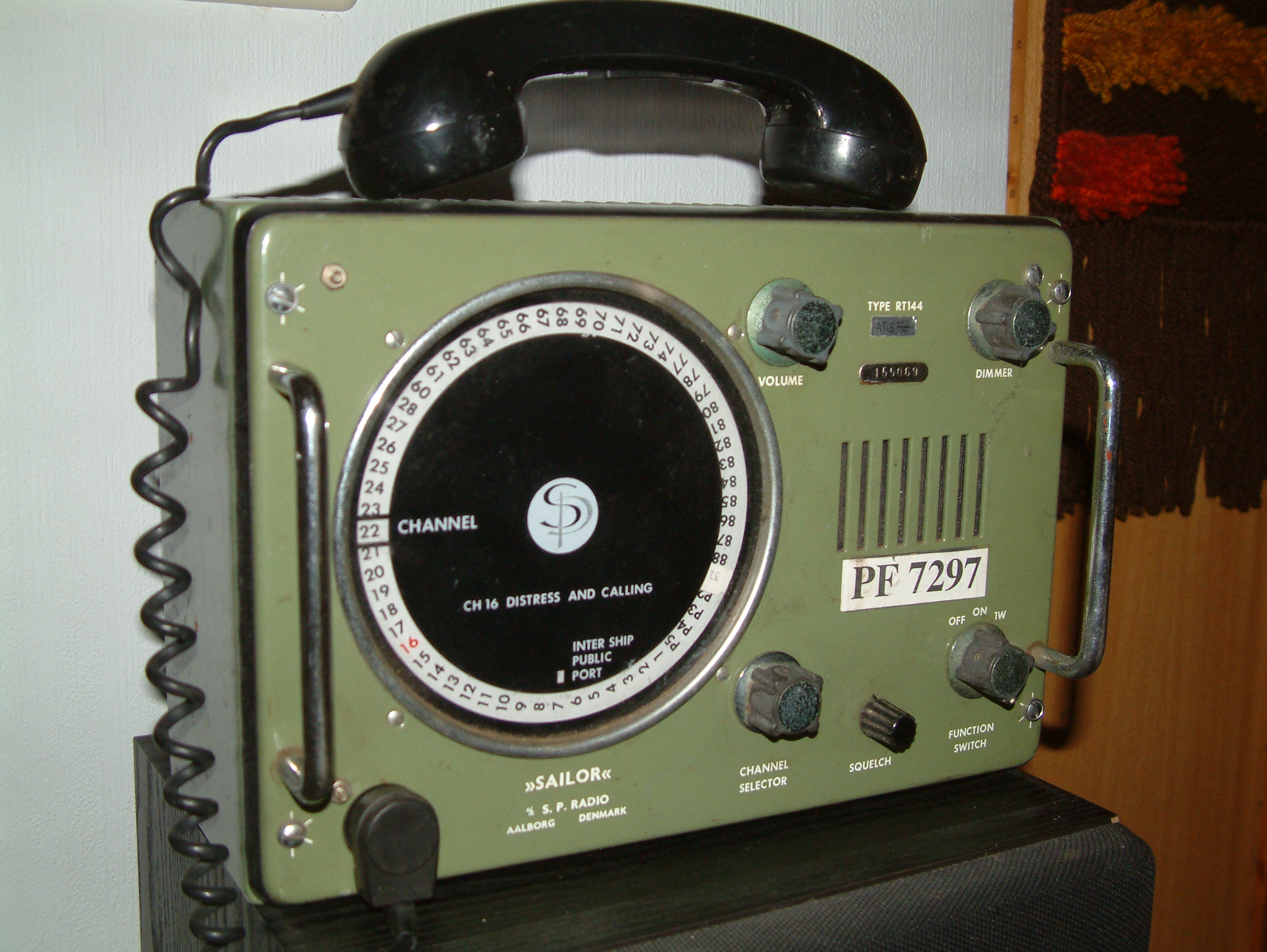
Radio transmitter with a label indicating it will identify any transmissions from it as coming from "PF7297" using the ATIS protocol

The Automatic Transmitter Identification System (ATIS) is a marine VHF radio system used and mandated on navigable inland waterways in Europe for identifying the ship or vessel that made a radio transmission. The identity of the vessel is sent digitally immediately after the ship's radio operator has finished talking and releases their transceiver's push-to-talk button. This contrasts to the Automatic identification system (AIS) used globally on ships that transmit continuously. A short post-transmission message is sent by the radio with the vessel identity and is in the form of an encoded call sign or Maritime Mobile Service Identity, starting with number "9" and the three country-specific maritime identification digits.

ATIS use on the Trans-European Inland Waterway network and connecting waterways is mandated by the Regional Arrangement Concerning the Radiotelephone Service on Inland Waterways (RAINWAT) agreements, which also prohibit the use of Digital Selective Calling (DSC) where ATIS is required, except in some near-coastal areas, or in sea-like areas of The Netherlands.

The database of ATIS vessel identities is maintained by the Belgian Institute for Postal Services and Telecommunications (fr) (nl).

The ATIS signalling protocol is based on that used for Digital Selective Calling (DSC); with the ATIS transmissions having the format specifier field set to a value of 121. While DSC transmissions take place exclusively on Channel 70, the ATIS digital signal is transmitted on the same VHF channel as the voice transmission: it lasts for 285 milliseconds after the PTT button has been released, using frequency modulation frequency-shift keying (FSK) between the frequencies of 1,300 Hz and 2,100 Hz at 1,200 baud. The core part of the message is transmitted using 10-bit codes; each code being formed of a 7-bit symbol followed by a 3-bit count of the number of zeros in that symbol.
