= ISO 3166-1 numeric =

Three-digit numeric code to identify countries

ISO 3166-1 numeric (or numeric-3) codes are three-digit country codes defined in ISO 3166-1, part of the ISO 3166 standard published by the International Organization for Standardization (ISO), to represent countries, dependent territories, and special areas of geographical interest. They are similar to the three-digit country codes developed and maintained by the United Nations Statistics Division, from which they originate in its UN M.49 standard. They were first included as part of the ISO 3166 standard in its second edition in 1981, but they were released by the United Nations Statistics Division since as early as 1970.

An advantage of numeric codes over alphabetic codes is script (writing system) independence. The ISO 3166-1 alphabetic codes (alpha-2 and alpha-3) use letters from the 26-letter English alphabet and are suitable for languages based on the Latin alphabet. For people and systems using non-Latin scripts (such as Arabic or Japanese), the English alphabet may be unavailable or difficult to use, understand, or correctly interpret. While numeric codes overcome the problems of script dependence, this independence comes at the cost of loss of mnemonic convenience.

Another advantage is that when countries merge or split, they will get a new numeric code, while the alphabetic code stays in use for (a part of) that country. A persistent number is needed in datasets with historical country information.

== Current codes ==
=== Officially assigned code elements ===
The following is a complete list of the current officially assigned ISO 3166-1 numeric codes, using a title case version of the English short names officially used by the ISO 3166 Maintenance Agency (ISO 3166/MA):

| Code | Country name | Notes |
|---|---|---|
| 004 | Afghanistan | |
| 008 | Albania | |
| 010 | Antarctica | |
| 012 | Algeria | |
| 016 | American Samoa | |
| 020 | Andorra | |
| 024 | Angola | |
| 028 | Antigua and Barbuda | |
| 031 | Azerbaijan | Before 1991: part of the USSR |
| 032 | Argentina | |
| 036 | Australia | |
| 040 | Austria | |
| 044 | Bahamas | |
| 048 | Bahrain | |
| 050 | Bangladesh | |
| 051 | Armenia | Before 1991: part of the USSR |
| 052 | Barbados | |
| 056 | Belgium | |
| 060 | Bermuda | |
| 064 | Bhutan | |
| 068 | Bolivia, Plurinational State of | |
| 070 | Bosnia and Herzegovina | Before 1992: part of Yugoslavia |
| 072 | Botswana | |
| 074 | Bouvet Island | |
| 076 | Brazil | |
| 084 | Belize | Formerly British Honduras |
| 086 | British Indian Ocean Territory | |
| 090 | Solomon Islands | Formerly British Solomon Islands |
| 092 | Virgin Islands (British) | |
| 096 | Brunei Darussalam | |
| 100 | Bulgaria | |
| 104 | Myanmar | Formerly Burma |
| 108 | Burundi | |
| 112 | Belarus | Formerly Byelorussian SSR |
| 116 | Cambodia | |
| 120 | Cameroon | |
| 124 | Canada | |
| 132 | Cabo Verde | Formerly Cape Verde |
| 136 | Cayman Islands | |
| 140 | Central African Republic | |
| 144 | Sri Lanka | Formerly Ceylon |
| 148 | Chad | |
| 152 | Chile | |
| 156 | China | |
| 158 | Taiwan, Province of China | |
| 162 | Christmas Island | |
| 166 | Cocos (Keeling) Islands | |
| 170 | Colombia | |
| 174 | Comoros | |
| 175 | Mayotte | Before 1975: part of Comoros; ISO code assigned in 1993 |
| 178 | Congo | |
| 180 | Congo, Democratic Republic of the | |
| 184 | Cook Islands | |
| 188 | Costa Rica | |
| 191 | Croatia | Before 1992: part of Yugoslavia |
| 192 | Cuba | |
| 196 | Cyprus | |
| 203 | Czechia | Before 1993: part of Czechoslovakia |
| 204 | Benin | Formerly Dahomey |
| 208 | Denmark | |
| 212 | Dominica | |
| 214 | Dominican Republic | |
| 218 | Ecuador | |
| 222 | El Salvador | |
| 226 | Equatorial Guinea | |
| 231 | Ethiopia | |
| 232 | Eritrea | Before 1993: part of Ethiopia |
| 233 | Estonia | Before 1991: part of the USSR |
| 234 | Faroe Islands | Previously spelled as Faeroe Islands |
| 238 | Falkland Islands (Malvinas) | |
| 239 | South Georgia and the South Sandwich Islands | Before 1993: part of the Falkland Islands |
| 242 | Fiji | |
| 246 | Finland | |
| 248 | Åland Islands | Before 2004: included in Finland |
| 250 | France | |
| 254 | French Guiana | |
| 258 | French Polynesia | |
| 260 | French Southern Territories | |
| 262 | Djibouti | Formerly French Territory of the Afars and the Issas |
| 266 | Gabon | |
| 268 | Georgia | Before 1991: part of the USSR |
| 270 | Gambia | |
| 275 | Palestine, State of | Replaced the Gaza Strip, which was assigned code 274 by the United Nations Statistics Division |
| 276 | Germany | A unified country since 1990 |
| 288 | Ghana | |
| 292 | Gibraltar | |
| 296 | Kiribati | Formerly Gilbert and Ellice Islands |
| 300 | Greece | |
| 304 | Greenland | |
| 308 | Grenada | |
| 312 | Guadeloupe | |
| 316 | Guam | |
| 320 | Guatemala | |
| 324 | Guinea | |
| 328 | Guyana | |
| 332 | Haiti | |
| 334 | Heard Island and McDonald Islands | |
| 336 | Holy See | |
| 340 | Honduras | |
| 344 | Hong Kong | |
| 348 | Hungary | |
| 352 | Iceland | |
| 356 | India | |
| 360 | Indonesia | |
| 364 | Iran, Islamic Republic of | |
| 368 | Iraq | |
| 372 | Ireland | |
| 376 | Israel | |
| 380 | Italy | |
| 384 | Côte d'Ivoire | Formerly Ivory Coast |
| 388 | Jamaica | |
| 392 | Japan | |
| 398 | Kazakhstan | Before 1991: part of the USSR |
| 400 | Jordan | |
| 404 | Kenya | |
| 408 | Korea, Democratic People's Republic of | |
| 410 | Korea, Republic of | |
| 414 | Kuwait | |
| 417 | Kyrgyzstan | Before 1991: part of the USSR |
| 418 | Lao People's Democratic Republic | |
| 422 | Lebanon | |
| 426 | Lesotho | |
| 428 | Latvia | Before 1991: part of the USSR |
| 430 | Liberia | |
| 434 | Libya | |
| 438 | Liechtenstein | |
| 440 | Lithuania | Before 1991: part of the USSR |
| 442 | Luxembourg | |
| 446 | Macao | |
| 450 | Madagascar | |
| 454 | Malawi | |
| 458 | Malaysia | |
| 462 | Maldives | |
| 466 | Mali | |
| 470 | Malta | |
| 474 | Martinique | |
| 478 | Mauritania | |
| 480 | Mauritius | |
| 484 | Mexico | |
| 492 | Monaco | |
| 496 | Mongolia | |
| 498 | Moldova, Republic of | Before 1991: part of the USSR |
| 499 | Montenegro | Before 2006: part of Yugoslavia/Serbia and Montenegro |
| 500 | Montserrat | |
| 504 | Morocco | |
| 508 | Mozambique | |
| 512 | Oman | Formerly Muscat and Oman |
| 516 | Namibia | |
| 520 | Naoero | Formerly Nauru |
| 524 | Nepal | |
| 528 | Netherlands, Kingdom of the | |
| 531 | Curaçao | Before 2010: part of the Netherlands Antilles |
| 533 | Aruba | Before 1986: part of the Netherlands Antilles |
| 534 | Sint Maarten (Dutch part) | Before 2010: part of the Netherlands Antilles |
| 535 | Bonaire, Sint Eustatius and Saba | Before 2010: part of the Netherlands Antilles |
| 540 | New Caledonia | |
| 548 | Vanuatu | Formerly New Hebrides |
| 554 | New Zealand | |
| 558 | Nicaragua | |
| 562 | Niger | |
| 566 | Nigeria | |
| 570 | Niue | |
| 574 | Norfolk Island | |
| 578 | Norway | |
| 580 | Northern Mariana Islands | Before 1986: part of Pacific Islands (Trust Territory) |
| 581 | United States Minor Outlying Islands | Merger of uninhabited U.S. islands on the Pacific Ocean in 1986 |
| 583 | Micronesia, Federated States of | Before 1986: part of Pacific Islands (Trust Territory) |
| 584 | Marshall Islands | Before 1986: part of Pacific Islands (Trust Territory) |
| 585 | Palau | Before 1986: part of Pacific Islands (Trust Territory) |
| 586 | Pakistan | |
| 591 | Panama | |
| 598 | Papua New Guinea | |
| 600 | Paraguay | |
| 604 | Peru | |
| 608 | Philippines | |
| 612 | Pitcairn | |
| 616 | Poland | |
| 620 | Portugal | |
| 624 | Guinea-Bissau | Formerly Portuguese Guinea |
| 626 | Timor-Leste | Formerly Portuguese Timor and East Timor |
| 630 | Puerto Rico | |
| 634 | Qatar | |
| 638 | Réunion | |
| 642 | Romania | |
| 643 | Russian Federation | Before 1991: part of the USSR |
| 646 | Rwanda | |
| 652 | Saint Barthélemy | Before 2007: part of Guadeloupe |
| 654 | Saint Helena, Ascension and Tristan da Cunha | |
| 659 | Saint Kitts and Nevis | Before 1985: part of Saint Kitts-Nevis-Anguilla |
| 660 | Anguilla | Before 1985: part of Saint Kitts-Nevis-Anguilla |
| 662 | Saint Lucia | |
| 663 | Saint Martin (French part) | Before 2007: part of Guadeloupe |
| 666 | Saint Pierre and Miquelon | |
| 670 | Saint Vincent and the Grenadines | |
| 674 | San Marino | |
| 678 | Sao Tome and Principe | |
| 682 | Saudi Arabia | |
| 686 | Senegal | |
| 688 | Serbia | Before 2006: part of Yugoslavia/Serbia and Montenegro |
| 690 | Seychelles | |
| 694 | Sierra Leone | |
| 702 | Singapore | |
| 703 | Slovakia | Before 1993: part of Czechoslovakia |
| 704 | Viet Nam | Official name: Socialist Republic of Viet Nam |
| 705 | Slovenia | Before 1992: part of Yugoslavia |
| 706 | Somalia | |
| 710 | South Africa | |
| 716 | Zimbabwe | Formerly Southern Rhodesia |
| 724 | Spain | |
| 728 | South Sudan | Before 2011: part of Sudan |
| 729 | Sudan | |
| 732 | Western Sahara | Formerly Spanish Sahara |
| 740 | Suriname | |
| 744 | Svalbard and Jan Mayen | |
| 748 | Eswatini | Formerly Swaziland |
| 752 | Sweden | |
| 756 | Switzerland | |
| 760 | Syrian Arab Republic | |
| 762 | Tajikistan | Before 1991: part of the USSR |
| 764 | Thailand | |
| 768 | Togo | |
| 772 | Tokelau | |
| 776 | Tonga | |
| 780 | Trinidad and Tobago | |
| 784 | United Arab Emirates | Formerly Trucial States |
| 788 | Tunisia | |
| 792 | Türkiye | |
| 795 | Turkmenistan | Before 1991: part of the USSR |
| 796 | Turks and Caicos Islands | |
| 798 | Tuvalu | |
| 800 | Uganda | |
| 804 | Ukraine | Before 1991: part of the USSR |
| 807 | North Macedonia | Before 1993: part of Yugoslavia |
| 818 | Egypt | Formerly United Arab Republic |
| 826 | United Kingdom of Great Britain and Northern Ireland | |
| 831 | Guernsey | Before 2006: included with the United Kingdom |
| 832 | Jersey | Before 2006: included with the United Kingdom |
| 833 | Isle of Man | Before 2006: included with the United Kingdom |
| 834 | Tanzania, United Republic of | |
| 840 | United States of America | |
| 850 | Virgin Islands (U.S.) | |
| 854 | Burkina Faso | Formerly Upper Volta |
| 858 | Uruguay | |
| 860 | Uzbekistan | Before 1991: part of the USSR |
| 862 | Venezuela, Bolivarian Republic of | |
| 876 | Wallis and Futuna | |
| 882 | Samoa | Formerly Western Samoa |
| 887 | Yemen | A unified country since 1990 |
| 894 | Zambia | |

=== User-assigned code elements ===
User-assigned code elements are codes at the disposal of users who need to add further names of countries, territories, or other geographical entities to their in-house application of ISO 3166-1. The ISO 3166/MA will never use these codes in the updating process of the standard. The numeric codes 900 to 999 can be user-assigned.

Examples include 926 for Kosovo and 977 for Cyprus used by Dun & Bradstreet.

== Withdrawn codes ==
When countries merge, split, or undergo territorial change, their numeric codes are withdrawn and new numeric codes are assigned. For example:

- East Germany and West Germany used numeric codes 278 and 280 respectively before their unification in 1990. Since then, the unified Germany has used numeric code 276, while keeping the alphabetic codes for West Germany (except in the banking area where they still use the 280 code).
- Ethiopia used numeric code 230 before Eritrea split away in 1993. Since then, Ethiopia has used numeric code 231, while keeping the same alphabetic codes.
- Sudan used numeric code 736 before South Sudan split away in 2011. Since then, Sudan has used numeric code 729, while keeping the same alphabetic codes.

If a country changes its name without any territorial change, its numeric code remains the same. For example, when Burma was renamed Myanmar without territorial change in 1989, its alphabetic codes were changed, but its numeric code 104 has remained the same.

The following numeric codes have been withdrawn from ISO 3166-1:

| Code | Country name | Notes |
|---|---|---|
| 128 | Canton and Enderbury Islands | |
| 200 | Czechoslovakia | |
| 216 | Dronning Maud Land | |
| 230 | Ethiopia | before Eritrea split away in 1993 |
| 249 | France, Metropolitan | |
| 278 | German Democratic Republic | i.e., East Germany |
| 280 | Germany, Federal Republic of | i.e., West Germany |
| 396 | Johnston Island | |
| 488 | Midway Islands | |
| 530 | Netherlands Antilles | after Aruba split away in 1986 |
| 532 | Netherlands Antilles | before Aruba split away in 1986 (Note: The numeric code was only changed in 1993.) |
| 536 | Neutral Zone | |
| 582 | Pacific Islands (Trust Territory) | |
| 590 | Panama | before adding Panama Canal Zone in 1979 |
| 658 | Saint Kitts-Nevis-Anguilla | |
| 720 | Yemen, Democratic | i.e., South Yemen |
| 736 | Sudan | before South Sudan split away in 2011 |
| 810 | USSR | |
| 849 | United States Miscellaneous Pacific Islands | |
| 872 | Wake Island | |
| 886 | Yemen Arab Republic | i.e., North Yemen |
| 890 | Yugoslavia, Socialist Federal Republic of | |
| 891 | Serbia and Montenegro | original name: Yugoslavia, Federal Republic of |

The following numeric codes were also assigned by the United Nations Statistics Division, but these territories were never officially included in ISO 3166-1:

| Code | Territory name |
|---|---|
| 274 | Gaza Strip (Palestine) |
| 282 | German Democratic Republic, Berlin |
| 284 | Germany, West Berlin |
| 650 | Ryukyu Islands |
| 728 | Spanish North Africa (note: this code is now used by South Sudan) |
| 830 | Channel Islands |

In the UN M.49 standard developed by the United Nations Statistics Division, additional numeric codes are used to represent geographical regions and groupings of countries and areas for statistical processing purposes, but these codes are not included in ISO 3166-1. Unlike alphabetic codes, there are no reserved numeric codes in ISO 3166-1.

== Sources and external links ==
- ISO 3166 Maintenance Agency, International Organization for Standardization (ISO)
- Standard Country or Area Codes for Statistical Use, United Nations Statistics Division
  - Countries or areas, codes and abbreviations — list of alpha-3 and numeric codes (a few territories officially assigned codes in ISO 3166-1 are not included in this list)
  - Composition of macro geographical (continental) regions, geographical sub-regions, and selected economic and other groupings
  - Country or area numerical codes added or changed since 1982
- The World Factbook (public domain), Central Intelligence Agency
  - Appendix D – Cross-Reference List of Country Data Codes — comparison of FIPS 10, ISO 3166, and STANAG 1059 country codes
- Administrative Divisions of Countries ("Statoids"), Statoids.com
  - Country codes — comparison of ISO 3166-1 country codes with other country codes
  - ISO 3166-1 Change History
