= List of UNDP country codes =

The United Nations Development Programme (UNDP) is a United Nations agency tasked with helping countries eliminate poverty, and achieve sustainable economic growth and [human development.

In addition to countries, UNDP codes identify geographical groupings and political entities such as various liberation fronts (not all of which still exist). The purpose of the codes is in part actuarial.

Trigram	Entity	Comment
AFG	Afghanistan	
ALB	Albania	
ALG	Algeria	
AMS	American Samoa	
ANA	Authorised Neutral Athlete	For Authorised athletes of banned countries - Like Russia at London 2017
ANC	ANC – South Africa	African National Congress – South Africa
AND	Andorra	
ANG	Angola	
ANL	Anguilla	
ANT	Antigua and Barbuda	
ARG	Argentina	
ARM	Armenia	
ARU	Aruba	
AUL	Australia	
AUS	Austria	
AZE	Azerbaijan	
BAH	Bahrain	
BAL	Baltic States	Estonia, Lithuania, Latvia
BAR	Barbados	
BDI	Burundi	
BEL	Belgium	
BEN	Benin	
BER	Bermuda	
BGD	Bangladesh	
BHA	The Bahamas	
BHU	Bhutan	
BIH	Bosnia-Herzegovina	
BKF	Burkina Faso	
BOL	Bolivia	
BOT	Botswana	
BRA	Brazil	Also RIO for "Brazil (Rio de Janeiro)" and SUB for "Brazil (Subin)"
BRU	Brunei	
BUL	Bulgaria	
BUR	Burma	Obsolete 1989; now Myanmar
BVI	British Virgin Islands	
BYE	Belarus	
BZE	Belize	
CAF	Central African Republic	
CAM	Central America	
CAN	Canada	
CAR	Caribbean	
CAY	Cayman Islands	
CHA	Undistributed Other	
CHD	Chad	
CHI	Chile	
CIS	Commonwealth of Independent States	
CKI	Cook Islands	
CMB	Cambodia	Formerly Kampuchea (KAM, 1975–1990) and Khmer Republic (KMR, 1970–1975)
CMR	Cameroon	
COI	Comoros	
COL	Colombia	
COS	Costa Rica	
CPR	People's Republic of China	
CRO	Croatia	
CUB	Cuba	
CVI	Cape Verde	
CYP	Cyprus	
CZE	Czech Republic	Since 1993
DAH	Dahomey	Obsolete 1977; now Benin
DEN	Denmark	
DJI	Djibouti	
DMI	Dominica	
DOM	Dominican Republic	
DRK	North Korea	
EAC	East African Community	Kenya, Tanzania, Uganda
ECU	Ecuador	
EGY	Egypt	
ELS	El Salvador	
EQG	Equatorial Guinea	Also EQL for "Equatorial Guinea (Douala)"
ERI	Eritrea	
EST	Estonia	
ETH	Ethiopia	
FAN	French Antilles	Probably means just St-Martin
FGU	French Guiana	
FIJ	Fiji	
FIN	Finland	
FLC	FLCS – Djibouti	Front de Libération de la Côte des Somalis
FOS	French Overseas Territories	Probably includes Saint-Pierre and Miquelon
FPL	French Polynesia	
FRA	France	
FSM	Federated States of Micronesia	
GAB	Gabon	
GAM	The Gambia	
GBS	Guinea-Bissau	
GDR	East Germany	Obsolete 1990
GEO	Georgia	
GER	Germany	
GHA	Ghana	
GIL	Gilbert Islands	Obsolete 1979; now Kiribati
GLO	Global	
GRE	Greece	
GRN	Grenada	
GUA	Guatemala	
GUD	Guadeloupe	
GUI	Guinea	
GUY	Guyana	
HAI	Haiti	
HLS	Vatican City (Holy See)	
HOK	Hong Kong	
HON	Honduras	
HUN	Hungary	
ICE	Iceland	
IND	India	
INS	Indonesia	
INT	Inter-Regional	
IRA	Iran	
IRE	Ireland	
IRQ	Iraq	
ISR	Israel	
ITA	Italy	
IVC	Côte d'Ivoire	
JAM	Jamaica	
JOR	Jordan	
JPN	Japan	
KAZ	Kazakhstan	
KEN	Kenya	
KIR	Kiribati	
KOS	Kosovo	
KUW	Kuwait	
KYR	Kyrgyzstan	
LAO	Laos	
LAT	Latvia	
LEB	Lebanon	
LES	Lesotho	
LIB	Libya	
LIE	Liechtenstein	
LIR	Liberia	
LIT	Lithuania	
LMA	?	Landmine Action UK (?)
LUX	Luxembourg	
MAC	Macau	
MAF	?	Mission Aviation Fellowship (?)
MAG	Madagascar	
MAL	Malaysia	
MAQ	Martinique	
MAR	Mauritius	
MAS	Marshall Islands	
MAT	Malta	
MAU	Mauritania	
MDV	The Maldives	
MEX	Mexico	
MIC	Federated States of Micronesia	
MLD	MLD – Djibouti	Mouvement de Libération de Djibouti
MLI	Mali	
MLW	Malawi	
MNC	Monaco	
MOL	Republic of Moldova	
MON	Mongolia	
MOR	Morocco	
MOT	Montserrat	
MOZ	Mozambique	
MTN	Montenegro	
MYA	Myanmar	
NAM	Namibia	
NAN	Netherlands Antilles	
NAU	Nauru	
NCA	New Caledonia	
NEP	Nepal	
NER	Niger	
NET	Netherlands	
NHE	New Hebrides	Obsolete 1980; now Vanuatu
NIC	Nicaragua	
NIR	Nigeria	
NIU	Niue	
NLM	National Liberation Movements	
MCD	North Macedonia	
NOR	Norway	
NZE	New Zealand	
OMA	Oman	
PAC	PAC – Azania	Pan Africanist Congress of Azania
PAE	PAE – Zimbabwe	Pacific Architects and Engineers
PAF	Patriotic Front for the Liberation of Zimbabwe	
PAK	Pakistan	
PAL	Occupied Palestinian Territory	
PAN	Panama	
PAR	Paraguay	
PDY	People's Democratic Republic of Yemen	Obsolete 1990
PER	Peru	
PHI	Philippines	
PMI	Pacific Multi Islands	Pacific Minor Islands?
PNG	Papua New Guinea	
PNL	?	Partidului National Liberal (National Liberal Party of Romania)?
POL	Poland	
POR	Portugal	
POT	Portuguese Territories (UNEPTSA)	United Nations Training Programme for Southern Africa (Angola and Mozambique)
PRC	Republic of the Congo	Formerly People's Republic of Congo (1970–1992)
PUE	Puerto Rico	
QAT	Qatar	
REU	Réunion	
ROK	South Korea	
ROM	Romania	
RUS	Russia	
RWA	Rwanda	
SAF	South Africa	
SAH	Western Sahara	
SAM	Samoa	
SAU	Saudi Arabia	
SEN	Senegal	
SEY	Seychelles	
SIK	Sikkim	Obsolete 1975
SIL	Sierra Leone	
SIN	Singapore	
SLO	Slovakia	
SNM	San Marino	
SOI	Solomon Islands	
SOM	Somalia	
SPA	Spain	
SPF	South Pacific Fund	
SRH	Southern Rhodesia	Obsolete 1980; now Zimbabwe
SRL	Sri Lanka	
SRV	North Vietnam	Former Socialist Republic of Vietnam; obsolete 1977
SSD	South Sudan	
STH	Saint Helena	
STK	Saint Kitts and Nevis	
STL	Saint Lucia	
STA	stateless	
STP	São Tomé and Príncipe	
STV	Saint Vincent and the Grenadines	
SUD	Sudan	Also SUC for "Sudan (Suba)"
SUR	Suriname	
SVN	Slovenia	
SWA	Swaziland	
SWE	Sweden	
SWI	Switzerland	
SWP	SWAPO	South West Africa People's Organization (Namibia)
SYR	Syria	
TAJ	Tajikistan	
TCI	Turks and Caicos Islands	
THA	Thailand	
TIM	Timor-Leste	
TOG	Togo	
TOK	Tokelau	
TON	Tonga	
TRI	Trinidad and Tobago	
TTP	Palau	Formerly the Trust Territory of the Pacific Islands (1986)
TUK	Turkmenistan	
TUN	Tunisia	
TUR	Turkey	
TUV	Tuvalu	
UAE	United Arab Emirates	
UAF	Undistributed – Africa	
UAP	Undistributed – Asia and the Pacific	
UGA	Uganda	
UKM	United Kingdom	
UKR	Ukraine	
ULA	Undistributed – Latin America and the Caribbean	
ULM	Undistributed – National Liberation Movements	
UPV	Upper Volta	Obsolete 1984, now Burkina Faso
URT	Tanzania	For "United Republic of Tanzania"
URU	Uruguay	
USA	United States	
USR	Union of Soviet Socialist Republics	Obsolete 1992
UVI	U.S. Virgin Islands	
UZB	Uzbekistan	
VAN	Vanuatu	
VEN	Venezuela	
VIE	Vietnam	
WES	Western Samoa	Became Samoa in 1998
WFI	Wallis and Futuna Islands	
WIR	West Irian	Obsolete 1973; now merged into Indonesia (Western New Guinea)
WPN	?	Women's Peace Network (?)
YEM	Yemen	
YUG	Yugoslavia	Progressively reduced starting in 1993
ZAI	Democratic Republic of the Congo	Formerly Zaire (1997)
ZAM	Zambia	
ZIM	Zimbabwe	
