= Maritime identification digits =

3-digit code to identify home country/base area

Maritime identification digits are used by radio communication facilities to identify their home country or base area in digital selective calling (DSC), Automatic Transmitter Identification System (ATIS), and Automatic identification system (AIS) messages as part of their Maritime Mobile Service Identities (MMSI). The International Telecommunication Union facilitates the assignment of MIDs to countries. Note that not all countries have MIDs; those without are typically landlocked, with no access to international waters. Sorting MID assignments in numerical order reveals a regional structure, with the first digit:

- 2 assigned to Europe,
- 3 to North America and the Caribbean,
- 4 to Asia (except the southeast),
- 5 to the Pacific and Eastern Indian Oceans and Southeast Asia,
- 6 to Africa, the Atlantic Ocean and Western Indian Ocean, and
- 7 to South America.

Country	Codes
Adélie Land (French Southern Territories)	501
Afghanistan	401
Alaska	303
Albania	201
Algeria	605
American Samoa	559
Andorra	202
Angola	603
Anguilla	301
Antigua and Barbuda	304; 305
Argentina	701
Armenia	216
Aruba	307
Ascension Island	608
Australia	503
Austria	203
Azerbaijan	423
Azores	204
Bahamas	308; 309; 311
Bahrain	408
Bangladesh	405
Barbados	314
Belarus	206
Belgium	205
Belize	312
Benin	610
Bermuda	310
Bhutan	410
Bolivia	720
Bonaire, Sint Eustatius and Saba	306
Bosnia and Herzegovina	478
Botswana	611
Brazil	710
British Virgin Islands	378
Brunei	508
Bulgaria	207
Burkina Faso	633
Burundi	609
Cambodia	514; 515
Cameroon	613
Canada	316
Cape Verde	617
Cayman Islands	319
Central African Republic	612
Chad	670
Chile	725
China	412; 413; 414
Christmas Island	516
Cocos (Keeling) Islands	523
Colombia	730
Comoros	616; 620
Congo (Republic of the)	615
Cook Islands	518
Costa Rica	321
Croatia	238
Crozet Archipelago	618
Cuba	323
Curaçao	306
Cyprus	209; 210; 212
Czech Republic	270
Democratic Republic of the Congo	676
Denmark	219; 220
Djibouti	621
Dominica	325
Dominican Republic	327
Ecuador	735
Egypt	622
El Salvador	359
Equatorial Guinea	631
Eritrea	625
Estonia	276
Eswatini	669
Ethiopia	624
Falkland Islands	740
Faroe Islands	231
Fiji	520
Finland	230
France	226; 227; 228
French Guiana	745
French Polynesia	546
Gabon	626
Gambia	629
Georgia	213
Germany	211; 218 (218 from former German Democratic Republic)
Ghana	627
Gibraltar	236
Greece	237; 239; 240; 241
Greenland	331
Grenada	330
Guadeloupe	329
Guatemala	332
Guinea	632
Guinea-Bissau	630
Guyana	750
Haiti	336
Honduras	334
Hong Kong	477
Hungary	243
Iceland	251
India	419
Indonesia	525
Iran	422
Iraq	425
Ireland	250
Israel	428
Italy	247
Ivory Coast	619
Jamaica	339
Japan	431; 432
Jordan	438
Kazakhstan	436
Kenya	634
Kerguelen Islands	635
Kiribati	529
Kuwait	447
Kyrgyzstan	451
Laos	531
Latvia	275
Lebanon	450
Lesotho	644
Liberia	636; 637
Libya	642
Liechtenstein	252
Lithuania	277
Luxembourg	253
Macau	453
Madagascar	647
Madeira	255
Malawi	655
Malaysia	533
Maldives	455
Mali	649
Malta	215; 229; 248; 249; 256
Marshall Islands	538
Martinique	347
Mauritania	654
Mauritius	645
Mexico	345
Micronesia (Federated States of)	510
Moldova	214
Monaco	254
Mongolia	457
Montenegro	262
Montserrat	348
Morocco	242
Mozambique	650
Myanmar	506
Namibia	659
Nauru	544
Nepal	459
Netherlands	244; 245; 246
New Caledonia	540
New Zealand	512
Nicaragua	350
Niger	656
Nigeria	657
Niue	542
North Macedonia	274
Northern Mariana Islands	536
North Korea	445
Norway	257; 258; 259
Oman	461
Pakistan	463
Palau	511
Palestine (Note: based on Resolution 99 of PP-98)	443
Panama	351; 352; 353; 354; 355; 356; 357; 370; 371; 372; 373; 374
Papua New Guinea	553
Paraguay	755
Peru	760
Philippines	548
Pitcairn Islands	555
Poland	261
Portugal	263
Puerto Rico	358
Qatar	466
Réunion	660
Romania	264
Russian Federation	273
Rwandese Republic	661
Saint Helena	665
Saint Kitts and Nevis	341
Saint Lucia	343
Saint Paul and Amsterdam Islands	607
Saint Pierre and Miquelon	361
Saint Vincent and the Grenadines	375; 376; 377
Samoa	561
San Marino	268
São Tomé and Príncipe	668
Saudi Arabia	403
Senegal	663
Serbia	279
Seychelles	664
Sierra Leone	667
Singapore	563; 564; 565; 566
Sint Maarten	306
Slovakia	267
Slovenia	278
Solomon Islands	557
Somalia	666
South Africa	601
South Korea	440; 441
South Sudan	638
Spain	224; 225
Sri Lanka	417
Sudan	662
Suriname	765
Sweden	265; 266
Switzerland	269
Syria	468
Taiwan	416
Tajikistan	472
Tanzania	674; 677
Thailand	567
Timor-Leste	550
Togo	671
Tonga	570
Trinidad and Tobago	362
Tunisia	672
Turkey	271
Turkmenistan	434
Turks and Caicos Islands	364
Tuvalu	572
Uganda	675
Ukraine	272
United Arab Emirates	470; 471
United Kingdom	232; 233; 234; 235
United States Virgin Islands	379
United States	338; 366; 367; 368; 369
Uruguay	770
Uzbekistan	437
Vanuatu	576; 577
Vatican City	208
Venezuela	775
Vietnam	574
Wallis and Futuna	578
Yemen	473; 475
Zambia	678
Zimbabwe	679
