= List of FIPS country codes =

Withdrawn Federal Information Processing Standard

This is a list of FIPS 10-4 country codes for Countries, Dependencies, Areas of Special Sovereignty, and Their Principal Administrative Divisions.

The two-letter country codes were used by the US government for geographical data processing in many publications, such as the CIA World Factbook. The standard is also known as DAFIF 0413 ed 7 Amdt. No. 3 (Nov 2003) and as DIA 65-18 (Defense Intelligence Agency, 1994, "Geopolitical Data Elements and Related Features").

The FIPS standard includes both the codes for independent countries (similar but often incompatible with the ISO 3166-1 alpha-2 standard) and the codes for top-level subdivision of the countries (similar to but usually incompatible with the ISO 3166-2 standard). The ISO 3166 codes are used by the United Nations and for Internet top-level country code domains.

Non-sovereign entities are in italics.

On September 2, 2008, FIPS 10-4 was one of ten standards withdrawn by NIST as a Federal Information Processing Standard. It was replaced in the U.S. Government by the Geopolitical Entities, Names, and Codes (GENC), which is based on ISO 3166.

== A ==
Code	Short-form name
AA	Aruba
AC	Antigua and Barbuda
AD	Akrotiri
AE	United Arab Emirates
AF	(Islamic Republic of Afghanistan) Afghanistan
AG	Algeria
AJ	Azerbaijan
AL	Albania
AM	Armenia
AN	Andorra
AO	Angola
AQ	American Samoa
AR	Argentina
AS	Australia
AT	Ashmore and Cartier Islands
AU	Austria
AV	Anguilla
AY	Antarctica

== B ==
Code	Short-form name
BA	Bahrain
BB	Barbados
BC	Botswana
BD	Bermuda
BE	Belgium
BF	Bahamas, The
BG	Bangladesh
BH	Belize
BK	Bosnia and Herzegovina
BL	Bolivia
BM	Burma
BN	Benin
BO	Belarus
BP	Solomon Islands
BQ	(United States) Navassa Island
BR	Brazil
BT	Bhutan
BU	Bulgaria
BV	Bouvet Island
BX	Brunei
BY	Burundi

== C ==
Code	Short-form name
CA	Canada
CB	Cambodia
CD	Chad
CE	Sri Lanka
CF	Congo (Brazzaville)
CG	Congo (Kinshasa)
CH	China
CI	Chile
CJ	Cayman Islands
CK	Cocos (Keeling) Islands
CM	Cameroon
CN	Comoros
CO	Colombia
CQ	Northern Mariana Islands
CR	Coral Sea Islands
CS	Costa Rica
CT	Central African Republic
CU	Cuba
CV	Cape Verde
CW	Cook Islands
CY	Cyprus

== D ==
Code	Short-form name
DA	Denmark
DJ	Djibouti
DO	Dominica
DR	Dominican Republic

== E ==
Code	Short-form name
EC	Ecuador
EE	European Union
EG	Egypt
EI	Ireland
EK	Equatorial Guinea
EN	Estonia
ER	Eritrea
ES	El Salvador
ET	Ethiopia
EU	(French Southern and Antarctic Lands) Europa Island
EZ	Czechia

== F ==
Code	Short-form name
FG	French Guiana
FI	Finland
FJ	Fiji
FK	Falkland Islands (Islas Malvinas)
FM	Micronesia, Federated States of
FO	Faroe Islands
FP	French Polynesia
FR	France
FS	French Southern and Antarctic Lands

== G ==
Code	Short-form name
GA	Gambia, The
GB	Gabon
GG	Georgia
GH	Ghana
GI	Gibraltar
GJ	Grenada
GK	Guernsey
GL	Greenland
GM	Germany
GO	(French Southern and Antarctic Lands) Glorioso Islands
GP	Guadeloupe
GQ	Guam
GR	Greece
GT	Guatemala
GV	Guinea
GY	Guyana
GZ	Gaza Strip

== H ==
Code	Short-form name
HA	Haiti
HK	Hong Kong
HM	Heard Island and McDonald Islands
HO	Honduras
HR	Croatia
HU	Hungary

== I ==
Code	Short-form name
IC	Iceland
ID	Indonesia
IM	Isle of Man
IN	India
IO	British Indian Ocean Territory
IP	Clipperton Island
IR	Iran
IS	Israel
IT	Italy
IV	Côte d'Ivoire
IZ	Iraq

== J ==
Code	Short-form name
JA	Japan
JE	Jersey
JM	Jamaica
JN	Jan Mayen
JO	Jordan
JU	(French Southern and Antarctic Lands) Juan de Nova Island

== K ==
Code	Short-form name
KE	Kenya
KG	Kyrgyzstan
KN	Korea, North
KR	Kiribati
KS	Korea, South
KT	Christmas Island
KU	Kuwait
KV	Kosovo
KZ	Kazakhstan

== L ==
Code	Short-form name
LA	Laos
LE	Lebanon
LG	Latvia
LH	Lithuania
LI	Liberia
LO	Slovakia
LS	Liechtenstein
LT	Lesotho
LU	Luxembourg
LY	Libya

== M ==
Code	Short-form name
MA	Madagascar
MB	Martinique
MC	Macau
MD	Moldova
MF	Mayotte
MG	Mongolia
MH	Montserrat
MI	Malawi
MJ	Montenegro
MK	North Macedonia
ML	Mali
MN	Monaco
MO	Morocco
MP	Mauritius
MR	Mauritania
MT	Malta
MU	Oman
MV	Maldives
MX	Mexico
MY	Malaysia
MZ	Mozambique

== N ==
Code	Short-form name
NC	New Caledonia
NE	Niue
NF	Norfolk Island
NG	Niger
NH	Vanuatu
NI	Nigeria
NL	Netherlands
NN	Sint Maarten
NO	Norway
NP	Nepal
NR	Nauru
NS	Suriname
NT	Netherlands Antilles
NU	Nicaragua
NZ	New Zealand

== O ==
Code	Short-form name
OD	South Sudan

== P ==
Code	Short-form name
PA	Paraguay
PC	Pitcairn Islands
PE	Peru
PF	Paracel Islands
PG	Spratly Islands
PJ	Etorofu, Habomai, Kunashiri, and Shikotan Islands
PK	Pakistan
PL	Poland
PM	Panama
PO	Portugal
PP	Papua New Guinea
PS	Palau
PU	Guinea-Bissau

== Q ==
Code	Short-form name
QA	Qatar

== R ==
Code	Short-form name
RE	Réunion
RI	Serbia
RM	Marshall Islands
RN	Saint Martin
RO	Romania
RP	Philippines
RQ	Puerto Rico
RS	Russia
RW	Rwanda

== S ==
Code	Short-form name
SA	Saudi Arabia
SB	Saint Pierre and Miquelon
SC	Saint Kitts and Nevis
SE	Seychelles
SF	South Africa
SG	Senegal
SH	Saint Helena, Ascension, and Tristan da Cunha
SI	Slovenia
SL	Sierra Leone
SM	San Marino
SN	Singapore
SO	Somalia
SP	Spain
SR	Suriname
ST	Saint Lucia
SU	Sudan
SV	Svalbard
SW	Sweden
SX	South Georgia and South Sandwich Islands
SY	Syria
SZ	Switzerland

== T ==
Code	Short-form name
TB	Saint Barthelemy
TC	United Arab Emirates
TD	Trinidad and Tobago
TE	(French Southern and Antarctic Lands) Tromelin Island
TH	Thailand
TI	Tajikistan
TK	Turks and Caicos Islands
TL	Tokelau
TN	Tonga
TO	Togo
TP	Sao Tome and Principe
TS	Tunisia
TT	Timor-Leste
TU	Türkiye
TV	Tuvalu
TW	Taiwan
TX	Turkmenistan
TZ	Tanzania

== U ==
Code	Short-form name
UC	Curaçao
UG	Uganda
UK	United Kingdom
UM	United States Minor Outlying Islands
UP	Ukraine
US	United States
UV	Burkina Faso
UY	Uruguay
UZ	Uzbekistan

== V ==
Code	Short-form name
VC	Saint Vincent and the Grenadines
VE	Venezuela
VI	British Virgin Islands
VM	Vietnam
VQ	United States Virgin Islands
VT	Vatican City

== W ==
Code	Short-form name
WA	Namibia
WE	West Bank
WF	Wallis and Futuna
WI	Western Sahara
WQ	Wake Island
WS	Samoa
WZ	Eswatini

== Y ==
Code	Short-form name
YM	Yemen

== Z ==
Code	Short-form name
ZA	Zambia
ZI	Zimbabwe

== Resources ==
- This article incorporates public domain material from Independent States (PDF). National Geospatial-Intelligence Agency. Archived (PDF) from the original on 2011-12-11.
- This article incorporates public domain material from Dependencies and Areas of Special Sovereignty (PDF). National Geospatial-Intelligence Agency. Archived (PDF) from the original on 2011-08-12.

The complete standard can be found at:

- https://web.archive.org/web/20090201000438/http://www.itl.nist.gov/fipspubs/fip10-4.htm

Updates to previous version of the standard (before FIPS-10 was withdrawn in September 2008) are at:

- https://web.archive.org/web/20070106052615/http://earth-info.nga.mil/gns/html/fips_files.htm.

Updates to the standard since September 2008 are at:

- https://web.archive.org/web/20110903191340/http://earth-info.nga.mil/gns/html/gazetteers2.html.
- FIPS PUB 10-4: Federal Information Processing Standard 10-4: Countries, Dependencies, Areas of Special Sovereignty, and Their Principal Administrative Divisions, April 1995
- DAFIF 0413, Edition 7, Amendment No. 3, November 2003
- DIA 65-18: Defense Intelligence Agency, Geopolitical Data Elements and Related Features, 1994

== See also ==
- List of FIPS region codes
