= List of ITU letter codes =

The radiocommunication division of the International Telecommunication Union uses the following letter codes to identify its member countries. Eight countries are assigned single-letter codes (B, D, E, F, G, I, J, S), while the rest have codes three letters in length.

ITU country symbols for its member states
Code	Country
A
AFG	Afghanistan
AFS	South Africa
AGL	Angola
ALB	Albania
ALG	Algeria
AND	Andorra
ARG	Argentina
ARM	Armenia
ARS	Saudi Arabia
ATG	Antigua and Barbuda
AUS	Australia
AUT	Austria
AZE	Azerbaijan
B
B	Brazil
BAH	Bahamas
BDI	Burundi
BEL	Belgium
BEN	Benin
BFA	Burkina Faso
BGD	Bangladesh
BHR	Bahrain
BIH	Bosnia and Herzegovina
BLR	Belarus
BLZ	Belize
BOL	Bolivia
BOT	Botswana
BRB	Barbados
BRM	Myanmar
BRU	Brunei
BTN	Bhutan
BUL	Bulgaria
C
CAF	Central African Republic
CAN	Canada
CBG	Cambodia
CHL	Chile
CHN	China
CLM	Colombia
CLN	Sri Lanka
CME	Cameroon
COD	Democratic Republic of the Congo
COG	Congo (Republic of the)
COM	Comoros
CPV	Cape Verde
CTI	Ivory Coast
CTR	Costa Rica
CUB	Cuba
CVA	Vatican City
CYP	Cyprus
CZE	Czech Republic
D
D	Germany
DJI	Djibouti
DMA	Dominica
DNK	Denmark
DOM	Dominican Republic
E
E	Spain
EGY	Egypt
EQA	Ecuador
ERI	Eritrea
EST	Estonia
ETH	Ethiopia
F
F	France
FIN	Finland
FJI	Fiji
FSM	Micronesia (Federated States of)
G
G	United Kingdom
GAB	Gabon
GEO	Georgia
GHA	Ghana
GMB	Gambia
GNB	Guinea-Bissau
GNE	Equatorial Guinea
GRC	Greece
GRD	Grenada
GTM	Guatemala
GUI	Guinea
GUY	Guyana
H
HND	Honduras
HNG	Hungary
HOL	Netherlands
HRV	Croatia
HTI	Haiti
I
I	Italy
IND	India
INS	Indonesia
IRL	Ireland
IRN	Iran
IRQ	Iraq
ISL	Iceland
ISR	Israel
J
J	Japan
JMC	Jamaica
JOR	Jordan
K
KAZ	Kazakhstan
KEN	Kenya
KGZ	Kyrgyzstan
KIR	Kiribati
KNA	Saint Kitts and Nevis
KOR	South Korea
KRE	North Korea
KWT	Kuwait
L
LAO	Laos
LBN	Lebanon
LBR	Liberia
LBY	Libya
LCA	Saint Lucia
LIE	Liechtenstein
LSO	Lesotho
LTU	Lithuania
LUX	Luxembourg
LVA	Latvia
M
MAU	Mauritius
MCO	Monaco
MDA	Moldova
MDG	Madagascar
MEX	Mexico
MHL	Marshall Islands
MKD	North Macedonia
MLA	Malaysia
MLD	Maldives
MLI	Mali
MLT	Malta
MNE	Montenegro
MNG	Mongolia
MOZ	Mozambique
MRC	Morocco
MTN	Mauritania
MWI	Malawi
N
NCG	Nicaragua
NGR	Niger
NIG	Nigeria
NMB	Namibia
NOR	Norway
NPL	Nepal
NRU	Nauru
NZL	New Zealand
O
OMA	Oman
P
PAK	Pakistan
PHL	Philippines
PLW	Palau
PNG	Papua New Guinea
PNR	Panama
POL	Poland
POR	Portugal
PRG	Paraguay
PRU	Peru
Q
QAT	Qatar
R
ROU	Romania
RRW	Rwanda
RUS	Russia
S
S	Sweden
SDN	Sudan
SEN	Senegal
SEY	Seychelles
SLM	Solomon Islands
SLV	El Salvador
SMO	Samoa
SMR	San Marino
SNG	Singapore
SOM	Somalia
SRB	Serbia
SRL	Sierra Leone
SSD	South Sudan
STP	São Tomé and Príncipe
SUI	Switzerland
SUR	Suriname
SVK	Slovakia
SVN	Slovenia
SWZ	Eswatini
SYR	Syria
T
TCD	Chad
TGO	Togo
THA	Thailand
TJK	Tajikistan
TKM	Turkmenistan
TLS	Timor-Leste
TON	Tonga
TRD	Trinidad and Tobago
TUN	Tunisia
TUR	Turkey
TUV	Tuvalu
TZA	Tanzania
U
UAE	United Arab Emirates
UGA	Uganda
UKR	Ukraine
URG	Uruguay
USA	United States
UZB	Uzbekistan
V
VCT	Saint Vincent and the Grenadines
VEN	Venezuela
VTN	Vietnam
VUT	Vanuatu
Y
YEM	Yemen
Z
ZMB	Zambia
ZWE	Zimbabwe

The ITU also designates the following codes for other areas around the world that are not member states.

ITU country symbols for non-member states, areas, organizations and special purposes
Code	Area
A
ABW	Aruba
AIA	Anguilla
ALS	Alaska
AMS	Saint Paul and Amsterdam Islands
AOE	/ Western Sahara
ASC	Ascension Island
ATA	Antarctic
AZR	Azores
B
BER	Bermuda
BIO	Chagos Islands
BLM	Saint Barthélemy
BVT	Bouvet Island
C
CG7	CUB(Guantanamo) (7). (Note: as defined in Appendix 26 to the Radio Regulations, Geneva, 1959; (7) means "USA stations")
CHR	Christmas Island
CKH	Cook Islands
CNR	Canary Islands
CPT	Clipperton Island
CRO	Crozet Archipelago
CYM	Cayman Islands
D
DGA	Diego Garcia
E
F
FLK	Falkland Islands (Malvinas)
FRO	Faroe Islands
G
GCA	United Kingdom (Non-metropolitan) – Region 1
GCC	United Kingdom – Region 3
GIB	Gibraltar
GRL	Greenland
GUF	French Guiana
GUM	Guam
H
HKG	Hong Kong (Special Administrative Region of China)
HMD	Heard and McDonald Islands
HWA	Hawaii
HWL	Howland Island
I
ICO	Cocos (Keeling) Islands
J
JAR	Jarvis Island
JON	Johnston Atoll
K
KER	Kerguelen Islands
M
MAC	Macau (Special Administrative Region of China)
MDR	Madeira
MDW	Midway Islands
MRA	Northern Mariana Islands
MRN	Marion Island
MRT	Martinique
MSR	Montserrat
MYT	Mayotte
N
NCL	New Caledonia
NFK	Norfolk Island
NIU	Niue
O
OCE	French Polynesia
P
PAQ	Easter Island
PHX	Phoenix Islands
PLM	Palmyra Island
PTC	Pitcairn Island
PTR	Puerto Rico
R
REU	Réunion
ROD	Rodrigues
S
SCG	ex Serbia and Montenegro → SRB, MNE
SHN	Saint Helena
SMA	American Samoa
SPM	Saint Pierre and Miquelon
SWN	Swan Islands
SXM	Sint Maarten
T
TCA	Turks and Caicos Islands
TKL	Tokelau
TRC	Tristan da Cunha
U
V
VIR	United States Virgin Islands
VRG	British Virgin Islands
W
WAK	Wake Island
WAL	Wallis and Futuna
X
XAA	shared throughout the world
XAX	shared by several countries, but in a restricted area of the world
XBR	special use
XBY	/ Abyei area
XCQ	ex Caroline Islands → FSM + PLW
XCS	ex TCH Czechoslovakia → CZE + SVK
XGZ	Gaza Strip
XMM	inter-ship communications
XOA	International Civil Aviation Organization
XR1	Region 1 (RR 5.3)
XR2	Region 2 (RR 5.4)
XR3	Region 3 (RR 5.5)
XRY	Antarctic Region (RR AP 26/5.2)
XSC	ex SCG Serbia and Montenegro
XSD	ex Republic of the Sudan before 14 July 2011 → SDN + SSD
XSP	Spratly Islands
XSU	ex URS Soviet Union → RUS + …
XUN	United Nations
XUU	unknown site
XWB	West Bank
XWM	World Meteorological Organization
XYU	ex YUG Yugoslavia → SCG… + HRV + BIH + SVN
XYZ	pending further developments regarding the administration responsible
XZZ	administrative status is subject to special arrangements
