= Kosovo passport =

Passport issued to citizens of Kosovo

Kosovo passport Pasaporta e Kosovës Косовски Пасош
- A front cover of a current Kosovo biometric passport

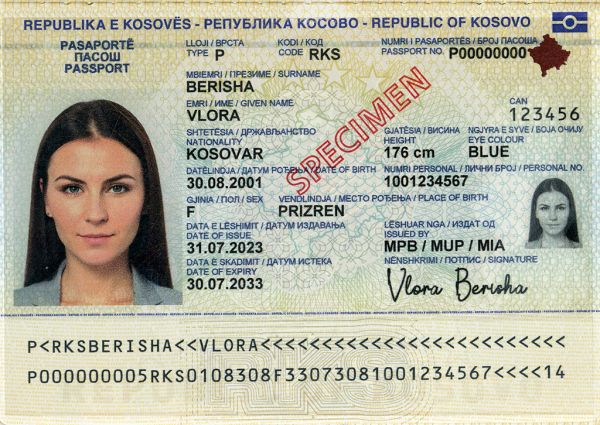
- The information page of a contemporary Kosovar biometric passport
- Type: Passport
- Issued by: Kosovo Ministry of Interior (MPB / MUP / MIA)
- First issued: 30 July 2008 (non-biometric); 31 October 2011 (biometric)
- Purpose: Identification and travel
- Eligibility: Kosovar citizenship
- Expiration: 10 years (age 18 and older); 5 years (for minors)
- Cost: €30 €15 (Pensioners) €20 for minors

The Kosovo passport (Albanian: Pasaporta e Kosovës; Serbian: Косовски Пасош, romanized: Kosovski Pasoš) is a travel document that is issued by the Interior Ministry of Kosovo to the citizens of Kosovo to enable them to travel abroad. The passports are also used as proof of identity within the country, along with the national identity card.

Kosovar passports comply with all the recommended standards set for machine-readable passports by the International Civil Aviation Organization (ICAO), but the country/citizenship code RKS is not within ISO 3166 and thus not ICAO-endorsed. The passport design was first disclosed on 14 March 2008.

The passport costs €30, €15 for retirees, €20 for minors and is valid for up to 10 years for adults and 5 years for minors.

== Biometric passport ==
The Kosovo biometric passport has been issued since 31 October 2011. In May 2011, the Ministry of Interior announced that biometric passports would be issued in the summer of 2011 after the winning firm is chosen and awarded the production of the passports.

=== Physical Appearance ===
The design of the biometric passport is a burgundy colour, with the emblem of Kosovo in the middle of the cover page. The word "Passport" is written on the cover of the passport in Albanian, Serbian and English. All relevant identity information about the bearer is printed in these languages as well. For citizens that are 18 years old or older, the passport is valid for 10 years from the date of issue.

=== Identity Information Page ===
The bearer page contains the following information:

- Type [P]
- Code [Country Code: RKS]
- Passport Number
- Surname(s)
- Given name(s)
- Place of Birth
- Date of Birth
- Citizenship [Kosovar]
- Sex
- Height
- Eye Colour
- Issuing Authority
- Personal Number
- Date of Issue/Expiry

In addition to a picture of the bearer's face, a fingerprint and the signature of the holder are also present on page 3.

== Other Passport Types ==
Apart from the ordinary biometric passport, Kosovo issues three other types of passports: Official, Diplomatic, and Travel Document.

=== Official ===
- Maroon cover
- Issued to political staff within the Government as well as their family members with a maximum validity of 5 years.

=== Diplomatic ===
- Black cover
- Issued to the President of the Republic, the Prime Minister, members of the Government, the President of the Constitutional Court, the President of the Supreme Court, Ambassadors as well as other diplomatic staff in embassies or consulates around the world, to the Ombudsperson, members of state delegations if so required, Government officials which have been appointed as representatives of the Government in various international organisations, diplomatic couriers as prescribed by law, and persons of interest as prescribed by the law with a maximum validity of 5 years.

=== Travel Document ===
- Light Blue cover
- Issued to the citizens of Kosovo if the original passport has been lost or stolen, and/or it has expired. It can also be issued for group travel of no fewer than 5 persons and no more than 50. A Travel Document has a maximum validity of 30 days.

== History ==
Before the introduction of the Kosovar national passports, travel documents in Kosovo were issued by the United Nations administration with a maximum validity of 2 years. Those travel documents ceased being issued in 2008 after the declaration of independence, and the last UNMIK travel documents expired in 2010.

The first Kosovar passports were issued on 30 July 2008. The passports had a blue colour and were only issued until 30 October 2011, when they were phased out to be replaced by the new burgundy biometric passports. The first passports were valid until expiration and the last passports expired in 2021.

Since 31 October 2011, all Kosovar passports are biometric. They are produced by Veridos Identity Solutions in Germany.

== Travel with Identity Card ==
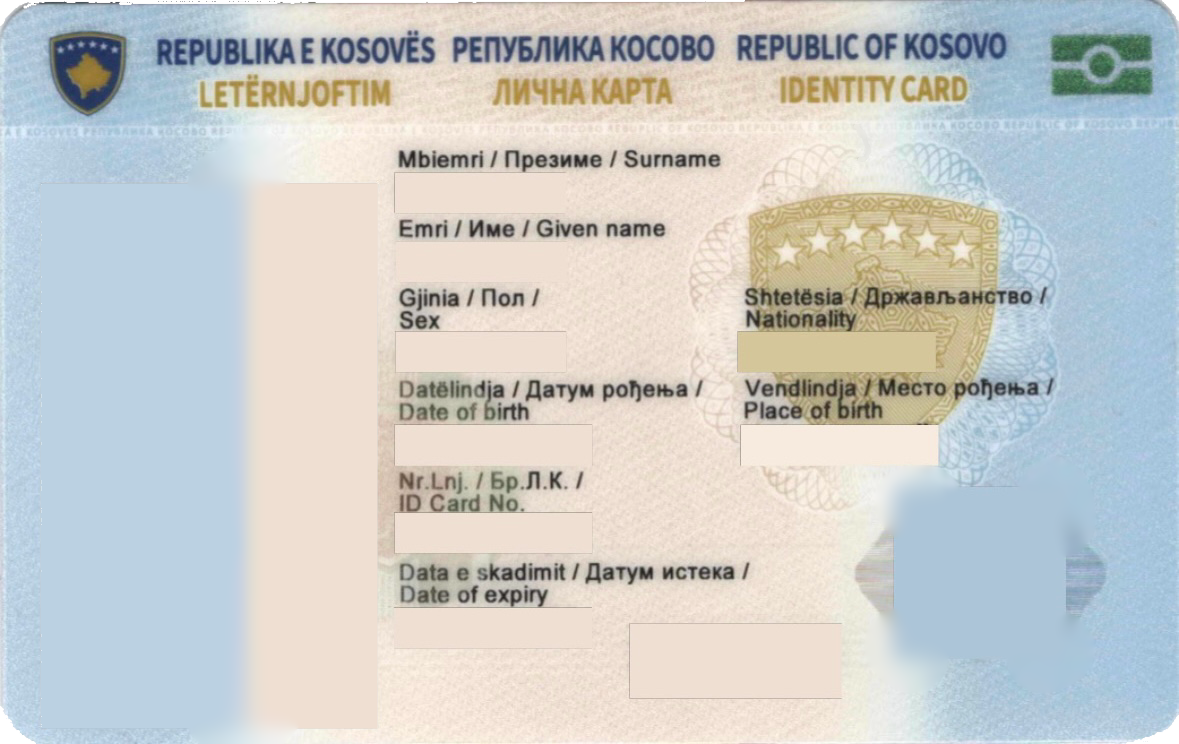
New Kosovar ID card Obverse

An identity card of Kosovo can be used instead of a passport for travel to some countries neighbouring Kosovo:

Countries (and territories)	Agreement / Stay
Albania	Freedom of Movement
North Macedonia	90 days
Montenegro	30 days
Serbia	60 days

== Visa requirements ==
=== Visa requirements map ===
Visa requirements for Kosovar citizens holding ordinary passports Kosovo ID card travel Visa not required Visa on arrival eVisa Visa available both online or arrival Visa required Admission refused

Visa requirements for Kosovar citizens are administrative entry restrictions by the authorities of other nations placed on citizens of Kosovo.

As of March 2026, Kosovar citizens had visa-free or visa on arrival access to 81 countries and territories, ranking the Kosovar passport 57th in the world in terms of travel freedom according to the Henley Passport Index.

== Passport Recognition ==
Kosovo States that officially recognise Kosovo and the Kosovar passport States that have not recognised Kosovo, but have stated that they accept the Kosovar passport States that have reportedly been visited even though these states do not recognise the Kosovar passport nor Kosovo's independence. States that have not recognised Kosovo and do not accept the Kosovar passport

Kosovo's declaration of independence is not universally recognised. Countries like the United States, the UK, Germany, and Japan do recognise Kosovo’s independence. Others, such as Russia, India, and China do not. Therefore, Kosovo's passports are not universally recognised as travel documents and some countries refuse entry to Kosovar citizens who show up with Kosovo passports.

=== Recognition of the passport while not recognising Kosovo as a country ===
Some countries have recognised the Kosovar passport as a travel document whilst not recognising Kosovo as a country. This situation is similar to that of the Taiwan passport, which many countries routinely process, even though they only maintain unofficial relations with Taiwan.

The following countries have officially stated that they accept the Kosovar passport as a valid travel document, whilst not formally recognising Kosovo as an independent country:

- Argentina Issues travel certificates instead of visas
- Armenia
- Bosnia and Herzegovina
- Brazil
- Chile
- Cyprus
- Greece
- Romania
- Slovakia
- Spain
- Ukraine

In addition there are countries to which people have apparently been able to travel on Kosovar passports, however where this is not officially stated policy or well established de facto practice this is not an indication that such a travel can be repeated in the future. Countries that have reportedly been visited in this manner include:

- Cambodia

- Democratic Republic of the Congo
- Morocco

==== Russia's position ====
Russia does not recognise Kosovo as an independent state, nor does it recognise the Kosovar Passport as a valid travel document for everyday entry to Russia under normal circumstances. However, the Kosovar Passport can be used to enter Russia in special cases such as to attend or participate in events under the auspices of the International Olympic Committee and other international sporting organisations, which Kosovo is a member of. Russia issues visas in the form of special forms inserted into the Kosovar Passports. The Russian Embassy in Belgrade published a statement about use of the Kosovar Passport in Russia:

"It is only possible to enter the territory of the Russian Federation with passports of the so-called Republic of Kosovo in cases based on the fulfilment of international obligations of the Russian Federation as a side-recipient of an event, which is organised through multilateral structures, whose member or participant is the so-called Republic of Kosovo... For other purposes, the procedure of entry of persons with Kosovo passports to the territory of Russia has not changed. Namely, their entry is not possible."

==== Serbia's position ====
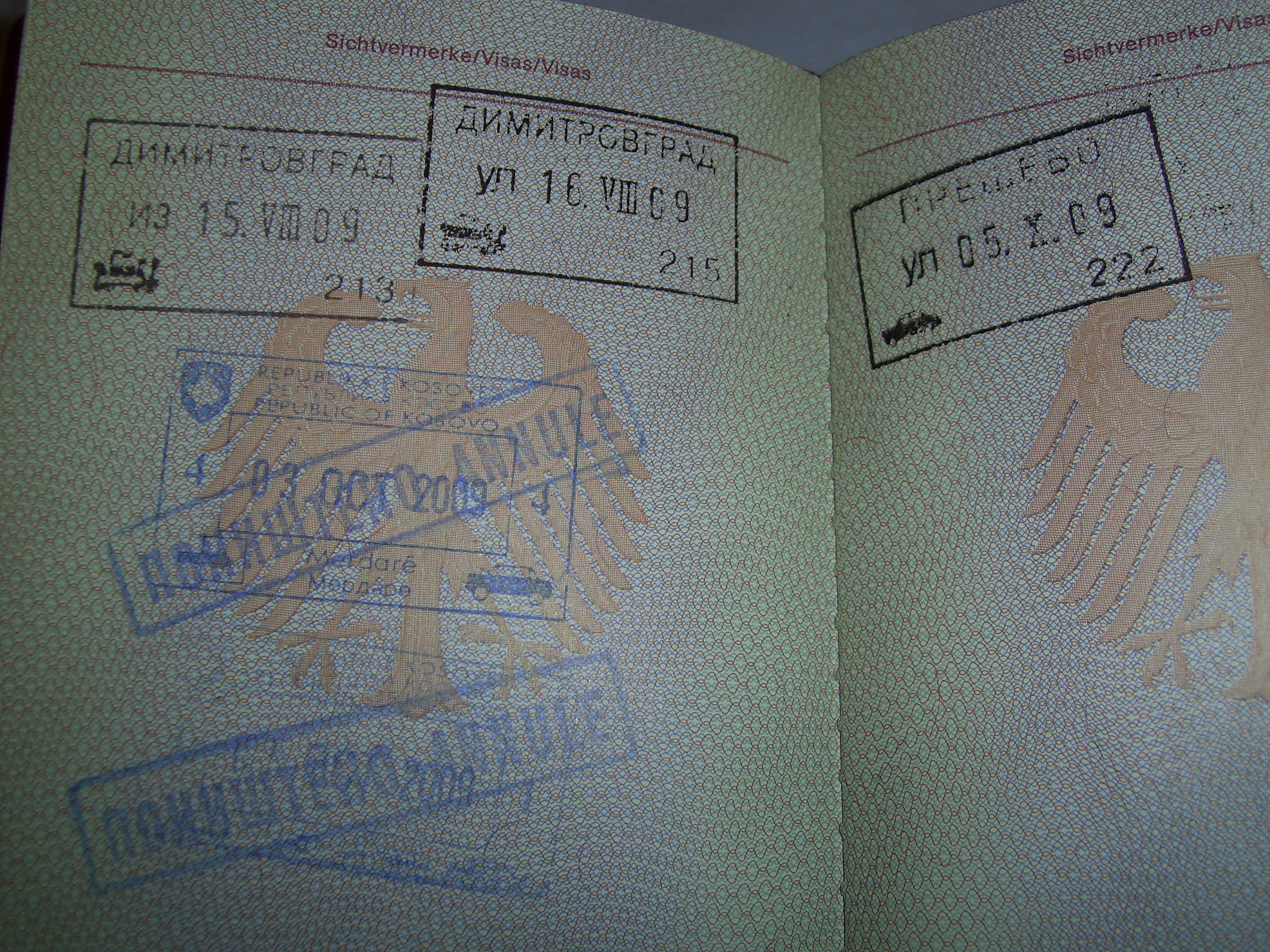
Kosovo passport stamps over-stamped by Serbian immigration officers on a German passport.

Serbia has not recognised Kosovo as an independent state. However in March 2023, Serbia concluded a normalisation agreement with Kosovo in European Union mediated dialogue. Under the terms of the agreement, Serbia committed to recognise Kosovo's official documents including passports and customs stamps. Citizens of Kosovo can freely enter Serbia and stay for 90 days with a valid identity card.

When the issuing of new Kosovar visas and passport stamps began in 2008, Serbia refused entry to people with entry and exit stamps of the Republic of Kosovo customs authority stamps or visas in their passports. In addition, border crossings from third countries (Montenegro, Albania, North Macedonia through land, many more through air travel) to Kosovo were considered illegal points of entry by Serbia, and it had created problems if one entered through there and then attempted to leave Serbia through another border crossing in Central Serbia or Vojvodina without a corresponding entry stamp. That practice, however, was soon abandoned and these were simply over-stamped (nullified), which potentially could have led to problems with long term Kosovar visas appearing to be annulled.

== See also ==
- International recognition of Kosovo
- Foreign relations of Kosovo
- List of diplomatic missions in Kosovo
- UNMIK Travel Document
- Visa requirements for Kosovar citizens
- Kosovo identity card
