= Visa requirements for Kosovar citizens =

Administrative entry restrictions

Visa requirements for Kosovar citizens are administrative entry restrictions by the authorities of other states placed on citizens of Kosovo.

As of 2026, Kosovar citizens had visa-free, visa on arrival or e-Visa access to 81 countries, ranking the Kosovar passport 56th in terms of travel freedom according to the Henley Passport Index.

On 18 April 2023, the European Parliament approved visa liberalisation for nationals of Kosovo with no objections.

From 1 January 2024, holders of a Kosovar passport were allowed to enter the Schengen Area, as well as Cyprus without a visa for short stays, or 90 days within a 180-day period.

== Future ==
- The President of the Republic of Kosovo, Vjosa Osmani, has discussed the issue of lifting visas between Qatar and Kosovo, but this has not yet been signed.
- As of 3 November 2022, an agreement was reached to allow Kosovars enjoy visa free access to Bosnia and Herzegovina with a valid ID card. This has been ratified by Kosovo, but not yet by Bosnia due to opposition from the leaders of Republika Srpska.

== Visa requirements map ==
Visa requirements for Kosovar citizens holding ordinary passports Kosovo ID card travel Visa not required Visa on arrival eVisa Visa available both online or arrival Visa required Admission refused

== Visa requirements ==
Visa requirements for holders of normal Kosovo passports travelling for tourist purposes:

Country	Visa requirement	Allowed stay	Notes (excluding departure fees)
Afghanistan	eVisa	30 days	Visa not required if born in Afghanistan.; Visa not required if born to parents who are nationals of Afghanistan.; Visa not required if born to parents who are born in Afghanistan but are not nationals of the country.; e-Visa : Visitors must arrive at Kabul International (KBL).
Albania	ID card valid	90 days	
Algeria	Visa required		
Andorra	Visa not required	90 days	
Angola	eVisa		
Antigua and Barbuda	Visa not required	90 days	
Argentina	Visa required		Argentina issues Travel Certificates instead of visas to nationals of Kosovo.
Armenia	Vesa required		Despite not recognising Kosovo's independence, Armenia has allowed Kosovo passports since 23 December 2024.
Australia	Online Visa required		May apply online (Online Visitor e600 visa).
Austria	Visa not required	90 days	90 days within any 180 day period in the Schengen Area. (Note: Holders of biometric passports only.)
Azerbaijan	Visa required		
Bahamas	Visa not required	3 months	
Bahrain	eVisa		
Bangladesh	Visa on arrival	30 days	
Barbados	Visa required		
Belarus	Visa required		
Belgium	Visa not required	90 days	90 days within any 180 day period in the Schengen Area.
Belize	Visa required		Permanent residents and holders of multiple entry visa of the US or Canada may obtain a visa on arrival.; Holders of a valid visa issued by a Schengen Member state are visa exempt for a maximum stay of 90 days.
Benin	eVisa	30 days	Must have an international vaccination certificate.
Bhutan	eVisa		
Bolivia	eVisa	30 days	
Bosnia and Herzegovina	Visa required		As of 3 November 2022, an agreement was reached to allow Kosovars enjoy visa free access to Bosnia and Herzegovina with a valid ID card. This has been ratified by Kosovo, but not yet by Bosnia due to opposition from the leaders of Republika Srpska.
Botswana	Visa required		
Brazil	Visa required		
Brunei	Visa not required	14 days	
Bulgaria	Visa not required	90 days	90 days within any 180 day period in the Schengen Area.
Burkina Faso	eVisa		
Burundi	Visa on arrival		
Cambodia	eVisa / Visa on arrival	30 days	
Cameroon	eVisa		Pre-arranged visa can be picked up on arrival.; International Certificate of Vaccination and current immunisation records required.
Canada	Visa required		
Cape Verde	Visa on arrival		Visa on arrival may obtain at Sal, Boa Vista, Sao Vicente and Santiago international airports. The visa allows you to stay for 90 days. Passport must is valid for at least another 6 months after the travel date.
Central African Republic	eVisa		
Chad	eVisa		
Chile	Visa required		
China	Visa required		
Colombia	eVisa		
Comoros	Visa on arrival	45 days	
Republic of the Congo	eVisa		
Democratic Republic of the Congo	eVisa	7 days	
Costa Rica	Visa required		
Côte d'Ivoire	eVisa	3 months	e-Visa holders must arrive via Port Bouet Airport.
Croatia	Visa not required	90 days	90 days within any 180 day period in the Schengen Area.
Cuba	Admission refused		Nationals of Kosovo (Rep.) are not allowed to enter and transit.
Cyprus	Visa not required	90 days	90 days within any 180 day period.
Czech Republic	Visa not required	90 days	90 days within any 180 day period in the Schengen Area.
Denmark	Visa not required	90 days	90 days within any 180 day period in the Schengen Area.
Djibouti	Visa required		
Dominica	Visa not required	21 days	
Dominican Republic	Visa required		Visa-free if holding a valid visa issued by Bulgaria, Canada, Cyprus, Ireland, Romania, United Kingdom, United States or member states of the Schengen Area.
Ecuador	Visa not required	90 days	
Egypt	eVisa	30 days	
El Salvador	Visa required		
Equatorial Guinea	eVisa		
Eritrea	Visa required		
Estonia	Visa not required	90 days	90 days within any 180 day period in the Schengen Area.
Eswatini	Visa required		
Ethiopia	eVisa / Visa on arrival	90 days	Visa on arrival is obtainable only at Addis Ababa Bole International Airport.; e-Visa holders must arrive via Addis Ababa Bole International Airport.; e-Visa is available for 30 or 90 days.
Fiji	eVisa		
Finland	Visa not required	90 days	90 days within any 180 day period in the Schengen Area.
France	Visa not required	90 days	90 days within any 180 day period in the Schengen Area.
Gabon	eVisa	90 days	e-Visa holders must arrive via Libreville International Airport.
Gambia	Visa not required	90 days	
Georgia	Visa required		
Germany	Visa not required	90 days	90 days within any 180 day period in the Schengen Area.
Ghana	Visa required		
Greece	Visa not required	90 days	90 days within any 180 day period in the Schengen Area.
Grenada	Visa required		
Guatemala	Visa required		
Guinea	eVisa	90 days	
Guinea-Bissau	Visa on arrival	90 days	
Guyana	Visa required		
Haiti	Visa not required	90 days	
Honduras	Visa required		
Hungary	Visa not required	90 days	90 days within any 180 day period in the Schengen Area.
Iceland	Visa not required	90 days	90 days within any 180 day period in the Schengen Area.
India	Visa required		
Indonesia	Visa required		
Iran	eVisa	30 days	
Iraq	eVisa		
Ireland	Visa required		Visa is issued free of charge.
Israel	Electronic Travel Authorisation	90 days	
Italy	Visa not required	90 days	90 days within any 180 day period in the Schengen Area.
Jamaica	Visa required		Must hold an Affidavit of Identity issued by Jamaica.
Japan	Visa required		
Jordan	eVisa / Visa on arrival		Visa can be obtained upon arrival, it will cost a total of 40 JOD, obtainable at most international ports of entry and land border crossings. (except King Hussein/Allenby Bridge)
Kazakhstan	Visa required		
Kenya	Electronic Travel Authorisation	90 days	Applications can be submitted up to 90 days prior to travel and must be submitted at least 3 days in advance.; eTA fee is 32.50 USD.; Proof of reservation at the hotel where visitors plan to stay is required (if staying with friends, an invitation letter is also acceptable).; Yellow fever vaccination certificate is required if coming from endemic countries.
Kiribati	Visa required		
North Korea	Visa required		Visitors travelling for tourist purposes must hold an authorisation to travel, issued by a travel company in Korea (Dem. People's Rep.).
South Korea	Visa required		
Kuwait	Visa required		
Kyrgyzstan	Visa required		
Laos	Visa on arrival	30 days	18 (Note: Savannakhet Airport; Lanetoui - Mengkang (China); Meuangmom - Wan Pong (Myanmar); Banvang - Ban Khok Phai (Thailand); Namngeun - Huay Kon (Thailand); Paksan - Bueng Kan (Thailand); Paktaphan - Pak Saeng (Thailand); Pangmon - Ban Huak (Thailand); Phoudou (Thailand); Dak ta ock - Nam Giang (Vietnam); La Lai (Vietnam); Namkan (Vietnam); Namphao - Cau Treo (Vietnam); Namsoy - Na Meo (Vietnam); Naphao - Cha Lo (Vietnam); Pahang - Long Sap (Vietnam); Panghok - Tây Trang (Vietnam); Phoukeua - Bo Y (Vietnam)) of the 33 border crossings are only open to regular visa holders.; e-Visa may be used to enter Laos through the Luang Prabang, Pakse and Vientiane international airports, 3 Thai-Lao Friendship Bridges (Note: Vientiane (Friendship Bridge 1); Savannakhet (Friendship Bridge 2); Bokeo (Friendship Bridge 4)), in Boten (road and railroad), and in Vientiane (at Khamsavath railway station).; Visa on arrival is available at the Luang Prabang, Pakse and Vientiane international airports, 4 Thai-Lao Friendship Bridges (Note: Vientiane (Friendship Bridge 1); Savannakhet (Friendship Bridge 2); Khammouane (Friendship Bridge 3); Bokeo (Friendship Bridge 4)) and 7 border crossings. (Note: Nongnokkheane - Trapeang Kriel (Cambodia); Boten - Bo han (China); Golden Triangle/Samliemkham (Thailand); Khamsavath railway station (Thailand); Namheuang - Ban Na Kraseng (Thailand); Vang tao - Chongmek (Thailand); Dansavan - Lao Bảo (Vietnam))
Latvia	Visa not required	90 days	90 days within any 180 day period in the Schengen Area.
Lebanon	Visa required		
Lesotho	eVisa		
Liberia	eVisa		
Libya	eVisa		
Liechtenstein	Visa not required	90 days	90 days within any 180 day period in the Schengen Area.
Lithuania	Visa not required	90 days	90 days within any 180 day period in the Schengen Area.
Luxembourg	Visa not required	90 days	90 days within any 180 day period in the Schengen Area.
Madagascar	eVisa/Visa on arrival	90 days	
Malawi	eVisa	90 days	
Malaysia	Visa not required	30 days	
Maldives	Free visa on arrival	30 days	Can be extended.
Mali	Visa required		
Malta	Visa not required	90 days	90 days within any 180 day period in the Schengen Area.
Marshall Islands	Visa on arrival	90 days	
Mauritania	eVisa		Available at Nouakchott–Oumtounsy International Airport.
Mauritius	Visa required		
Mexico	Visa required		
Micronesia	Visa not required	30 days	
Moldova	eVisa		
Monaco	Visa not required	90 days	90 days within any 180 day period.
Mongolia	Visa required		
Montenegro	ID card valid	90 days	
Morocco	Visa required		
Mozambique	eVisa/Visa on arrival	30 days	
Myanmar	Visa required		
Namibia	Visa required		
Nauru	Visa required		
Nepal	Online Visa / Visa on arrival	90 days	15 Days – 30 USD; 30 Days – 50 USD; 90 Days – 125 USD
Netherlands	Visa not required	90 days	90 days within any 180 day period in the Schengen Area.
New Zealand	Visa required		Holders of an Australian Permanent Resident Visa or Resident Return Visa may be granted a New Zealand Resident Visa on arrival permitting indefinite stay (pursuant to the Trans-Tasman Travel Arrangement), subject to meeting character requirements and obtaining an Electronic Travel Authority prior to departure.
Nicaragua	Visa required		Visa on arrival for holders of a visa issued by Canada, United States or member states of the Schengen Area.
Niger	Visa required		
Nigeria	eVisa	90 days	
North Macedonia	ID card valid	90 days	
Norway	Visa not required	90 days	90 days within any 180 day period in the Schengen Area.
Oman	Visa required		
Pakistan	eVisa	90 days	
Palau	Free visa on arrival	30 days	Can be extended twice only with a fee.
Panama	Visa required		Visa-free if holding a valid multiple entry visa issued by Australia, Canada, Schengen, and United States.
Papua New Guinea	eVisa	60 days	Visitors may apply for a visa online under the "Tourist - Own Itinerary" category.
Paraguay	Visa required		
Peru	Visa required		
Philippines	Visa required		Residents of the United Arab Emirates may obtain an eVisa through the official Philippine eVisa website. A valid Emirati residence visa must be shown upon an eVisa application.
Poland	Visa not required	90 days	90 days within any 180 day period in the Schengen Area.
Portugal	Visa not required	90 days	90 days within any 180 day period in the Schengen Area.
Qatar	Visa required		Nationals of Kosovo (Rep.) travelling as tourists must have a hotel reservation confirmation and at least 1,500 USD.- or a major credit card.
Romania	Visa not required	90 days	90 days within any 180 day period in the Schengen Area.
Russia	Visa required		
Rwanda	eVisa / Visa on arrival	30 days	
Saint Kitts and Nevis	eVisa		
Saint Lucia	Visa required		
Saint Vincent and the Grenadines	Visa not required	30 days	
Samoa	Visa not required	60 days	
San Marino	Visa not required	90 days	90 days within any 180 day period.
São Tomé and Príncipe	Visa required		
Saudi Arabia	eVisa / Visa on arrival	90 days	
Senegal	Visa required		Visa on arrival if holding an official invitation letter issued by a Senegalese Authority to participants of international events or proof of accommodation.
Serbia	ID card valid	90 days	Kosovan citizens aged 16+ may travel with a valid ID card, those under 16 require a birth certificate with a stamped photo. Kosovan passports are not valid for entry into Serbia
Seychelles	Electronic Border System	15 days	Application can be submitted up to 30 days before travel.; Visitors must upload a reservation confirmation(s) for each visitor's location of stay in Seychelles.; Yellow fever vaccination certificate is required if coming from endemic countries.; Payment of the fee (EUR 10) by credit or debit card.; Valid for one journey only and it expires once exit the country.
Sierra Leone	eVisa	3 months	
Singapore	eVisa		Conditions apply
Slovakia	Visa not required	90 days	90 days within any 180 day period in the Schengen Area.
Slovenia	Visa not required	90 days	90 days within any 180 day period in the Schengen Area.
Solomon Islands	Visa required		
Somalia	eVisa	30 days	All visitors must have an approved Electronic Visa (eTAS) before the start of their journey.
South Africa	Visa required		
South Sudan	eVisa		Obtainable online.; Printed visa authorisation must be presented at the time of travel.
Spain	Visa not required	90 days	90 days within any 180 day period in the Schengen Area.
Sri Lanka	ETA/Visa on arrival	30 days	
Sudan	Visa required		
Suriname	Visa not required	90 days	An entrance fee of USD 50 or EUR 50 must be paid online prior to arrival.; Multiple entry e-Visa is also available.
Sweden	Visa not required	90 days	90 days within any 180 day period in the Schengen Area.
Switzerland	Visa not required	90 days	90 days within any 180 day period in the Schengen Area.
Syria	eVisa		
Taiwan	Visa not required	90 days	
Tajikistan	Visa required		
Tanzania	eVisa / Visa on arrival	90 days	
Thailand	eVisa	60 days	
Timor-Leste	Visa on arrival	30 days	
Togo	eVisa	15 days	
Tonga	Visa required		
Trinidad and Tobago	eVisa		
Tunisia	Visa required		
Turkey	Visa not required	90 days	
Turkmenistan	Visa required		
Tuvalu	Visa on arrival	30 days	
Uganda	eVisa	3 months	
Ukraine	Visa required		
United Arab Emirates	Visa not required	90 days	
United Kingdom	Visa required		
United States	Visa required		
Uruguay	Visa required		
Uzbekistan	Visa required		
Vanuatu	eVisa		
Vatican City	Visa not required	90 days	90 days within any 180 day period.
Venezuela	eVisa		
Vietnam	eVisa		e-Visa is valid for 90 days and multiple entry.; Phú Quốc Visa exemption for up to 30 days.
Yemen	Visa required		Yemen introduced an e-Visa system for visitors who meet certain eligibility requirements (group travel of 10 or more people, business trips, and transit etc.).
Zambia	eVisa		
Zimbabwe	eVisa	3 months	

== Territories and disputed areas ==
Visa requirements for Kosovar citizens for visits to various territories, disputed areas, partially recognised countries and restricted zones:

Visitor to	Visa requirement	Notes (excluding departure fees)
Europe
Abkhazia	Visa required	
Akrotiri and Dhekelia	Visa not required	28 days
Mount Athos	Special permit required	Special permit required (4 days: 25 euro for Orthodox visitors, 35 euro for non-Orthodox visitors, 18 euro for students). There is a visitors' quota: maximum 100 Orthodox and 10 non-Orthodox per day and women are not allowed.
Turkish Republic of Northern Cyprus	Visa not required	3 months.
(United Nations) UN Buffer Zone in Cyprus	Access Permit required	Access Permit is required for travelling inside the zone, except Civil Use Areas.
Faroe Islands	Visa not required	
Gibraltar	Visa required	
Guernsey	Visa required	
Isle of Man	Visa required	
(Norway) Jan Mayen	Visa required	Permit issued by the local police required for staying for less than 24 hours and permit issued by the Norwegian police for staying for more than 24 hours.
Jersey	Visa required	
South Ossetia	Visa required	
(Norway) Svalbard	Unlimited stay	Freedom of movement.; Everybody may live and work in Svalbard indefinitely regardless of country of citizenship.
Transnistria	Permission required	
Africa
British Indian Ocean Territory	Visa required	Special permit required.
(Spain) Canary Islands	Visa not required	90 days
Eritrea outside Asmara	Visa required	To travel in the rest of the country, a Travel Permit for Foreigners is required (20 Eritrean nakfa).
(Portugal) Madeira	Visa not required	90 days
Mayotte	Visa required	
Réunion	Visa required	
Ascension Island	eVisa	3 months within any year period.
Saint Helena	Visitor's Pass required	Visitor's Pass granted on arrival valid for 4/10/21/60/90 days for 12/14/16/20/25 pound sterling.
Tristan da Cunha	Visa required	Permission to land required for 15/30 pounds sterling (yacht/ship passenger) for Tristan da Cunha Island or 20 pounds sterling for Gough Island, Inaccessible Island or Nightingale Islands.
Sahrawi Arab Democratic Republic		Undefined visa regime in the Western Sahara controlled territory.
Somaliland	Visa on arrival	30 days for 30 US dollars, payable on arrival.
Sudan	Permit required	All foreigners travelling more than 25 kilometres outside of Khartoum must obtain a travel permit.
(Sudan) Darfur	Permit required	Separate travel permit is required.
Asia
(China) Hainan	Visa required	Haikou Meilan International Airport and Sanya Phoenix International Airport. Visa not required for 21 days for travelling as part of a tourist group (2 or more people). (Note: Tours must be organised by a travel agent registered in Hainan province and approved by the National Tourism Administration of China.)
Hong Kong	Visa required	
India PAP/RAP	PAP/RAP required	Protected Area Permit (PAP) required for whole states of Nagaland and Sikkim and parts of states Manipur, Arunachal Pradesh, Uttaranchal, Jammu and Kashmir, Rajasthan, Himachal Pradesh. Restricted Area Permit (RAP) required for all of Andaman and Nicobar Islands and parts of Sikkim. Some of these requirements are occasionally lifted for a year.
Iraqi Kurdistan	eVisa	30 days
(Iran) Kish Island	Visa not required	14 days. Visitors to Kish Island do not require a visa.
Macao	Visa on arrival	
(Malaysia) Sabah and Sarawak	Visa required	These states have their own immigration authorities and passport is required to travel to them, however the same visa applies.
Maldives	Permission required	With the exception of the capital Malé, tourists are generally prohibited from visiting non-resort islands without the express permission of the Government of Maldives.
North Korea outside Pyongyang	Special permit required	People are not allowed to leave the capital city, tourists can only leave the capital with a governmental tourist guide (no independent moving).
Palestine	Visa not required	Arrival by sea to Gaza Strip not allowed.
(China) Tibet Autonomous Region	TTP required	Tibet Travel Permit required (10 US Dollars).
(United Nations) Korean Demilitarized Zone	Restricted zone.	
(United Nations) UNDOF Zone and Ghajar	Restricted zone.	
(Vietnam) Phú Quốc	Visa not required	30 days.
Yemen	Special permission required	Special permission needed for travel outside Sana'a or Aden.
Caribbean and North Atlantic
Anguilla	e-Visa	
Aruba	Visa required	Visa is not required for Holders of a valid "D" visa issued by a Schengen Member State.
(Portugal) Azores	Visa not required	90 days
Bermuda	Visa required	
(Netherlands) Bonaire, St. Eustatius and Saba	Visa required	
British Virgin Islands	Visa required	
Cayman Islands	Visa required	
(Colombia) San Andrés and Leticia	Tourist Card on arrival	Visitors arriving at Gustavo Rojas Pinilla International Airport and Alfredo Vásquez Cobo International Airport must buy tourist cards on arrival.
Curacao	Visa required	
(France) French Guiana	Visa required	
(France) French West Indies	Visa required	French West Indies refers to Martinique, Guadeloupe, Saint Martin and Saint Barthélemy.
Greenland	Visa not required	
(Venezuela) Margarita Island	Visa required	All visitors are fingerprinted.
Montserrat	e-Visa	
Puerto Rico	Visa required	
Sint Maarten	Visa required	
Turks and Caicos Islands	Visa required	
U.S. Virgin Islands	Visa required	
Oceania
American Samoa	Visa required	
(Australia) Ashmore and Cartier Islands	Special authorisation required	Special authorisation required.
(France) Clipperton Island	Visa required	Special permit required.
Cook Islands	Visa not required	31 days.
French Polynesia	Visa required	
New Caledonia	Visa required	
(France) Wallis and Futuna	Visa required	
(Fiji) Lau Province	Special permission required	Special permission required.
Guam	Visa required	
Niue	Visa not required	30 days.
Northern Mariana Islands	Visa required	
Pitcairn Islands	Visa not required	14 days visa free and landing fee 35 USD or tax of 5 USD if not going ashore.
United States Minor Outlying Islands	Special permits required	Special permits required for Baker Island, Howland Island, Jarvis Island, Johnston Atoll, Kingman Reef, Midway Atoll, Palmyra Atoll and Wake Island.
South America
Galápagos	Pre-registration required	Online pre-registration is required. Transit Control Card must also be obtained at the airport prior to departure.
South Atlantic and Antarctica
Falkland Islands	Visa required	
South Georgia and the South Sandwich Islands	Permit required	Pre-arrival permit from the Commissioner required (72 hours / 1 month for 110/160 pounds sterling).
Antarctica		Special permits required for British Antarctic Territory, French Southern and Antarctic Lands, Argentine Antarctica, (Australia) Australian Antarctic Territory, (Australia) Heard Island and McDonald Islands, (Antártica Chilena Province) Chilean Antarctic Territory, (Norway) Peter I Island, (Norway) Queen Maud Land, (New Zealand) Ross Dependency.

== Israeli stamps ==
Kuwait, Lebanon, Libya, and Yemen do not allow entry to people with passport stamps from Israel or whose passports have either a used or an unused Israeli visa, or where there is evidence of previous travel to Israel such as entry or exit stamps from neighbouring border posts in transit countries such as Jordan and Egypt.

To circumvent this Arab League boycott of Israel, the Israeli immigration services have now mostly ceased to stamp foreign nationals' passports on either entry to or exit from Israel (unless the entry is for some work-related purposes). Since 15 January 2013, Israel no longer stamps foreign passports at Ben Gurion Airport. Passports are still (as of 22 June 2017) stamped at Erez when passing into and out of Gaza.

Iran refuses admission to holders of passports containing an Israeli visa or stamp that is less than 12 months old.

== Diplomatic and official passports only ==
Countries	allowed stay
Japan	90 days

== Kosovar ID as optional passport replacement ==
Citizens of the Republic of Kosovo can use their ID cards instead of passports to enter these countries.

- Albania
- North Macedonia
- Montenegro
- Serbia

== See also ==
- Visa policy of Kosovo
- Kosovar passport
- List of nationalities forbidden at border
