= Hoti (surname) =

Hoti is an Albanian surname derived from the Hoti tribe in northern Albania. It is found mainly in northern Albania, Montenegro and Kosovo. Notable people with the surname include:

- Abdul Ghafoor Hoti (1923–1998), Pakistani politician
- Akbar Khan Hoti (born 1956), Pakistani police officer
- Alban Hoti (born 1984), Kosovar Albanian politician and activist
- Andi Hoti (born 2003), Kosovan footballer
- Andi Hoti (footballer, born December 2003)
- Avdullah Hoti (born 1976), Kosovan politician, Prime Minister of Kosovo 2020–2021
- Azam Khan Hoti (1946–2015), Pakistan Army captain and politician
- Bislim Hoti (born 1959), Kosovar politician
- Engjëll Hoti (born 1997), Albanian-Kosovan footballer
- Florent Hoti (born 2000), English footballer
- Fortesa Hoti (born 1988), Swedish actress
- Haider Khan Hoti (born 1971), Pakistani Pashtun politician
- Ilir Hoti (1957–2016), Albanian economist and university teacher
- Muhammad Khan Hoti, Pakistani politician
- Muhammad Ali Khan Hoti (1922–2012), Pakistani politician
- Musa Hoti (1946–2004), Albanian activist
- Pavlina Hoti, Albanian politician
- Ukshin Hoti (1943–1999), Albanian philosopher and activist
- Vanesa Hoti (born 1998), footballer
