= Hoti =

Hoti may refer to:

- Hoti (region), a region of Malësia in northern Albania and southern Montenegro
- Hoti (tribe), an Albanian tribe
- Hoti (surname), an Albanian surname derived from the Hoti tribe in northern Albania
- Hoti, Mardan, an area in the Mardan District of Khyber Pakhtunkhwa, Pakistan
- Hoti, Plav, a village in Montenegro
- Hoti language, an extinct language of Indonesia
- Hodï (also spelt Hoti), an indigenous group living in the Venezuelan Amazon, and their language

== People ==
- Haider Khan Hoti
- Azam Khan Hoti
- Muhammad Khan Hoti
- Akbar Khan Hoti
- Abdul Ghafoor Hoti
