= Lična karta =

Lična karta or lichna karta (Cyrillic: Лична карта) is a South Slavic (Serbian, Bosnian, Montenegrin, Macedonian and Bulgarian) term literally meaning personal card and may refer to the national identity cards of any of the following countries and territories:

- Serbia - see Serbian identity card
- Bosnia and Herzegovina - see Bosnian-Herzegovinian identity card (also called Osobna iskaznica in Croatian)
- Montenegro - see Montenegrin identity card
- North Macedonia - see Macedonian identity card
- Bulgaria - see Bulgarian identity card
- Kosovo - see Kosovo identity card (also called Letërnjoftim in Albanian)
