= Visa policy of Kosovo =

Policy on permits required to enter Kosovo

Visitors to Kosovo must obtain a visa from one of the Kosovar diplomatic missions unless they are citizens from one of the visa-exempt countries.

== Visa policy map ==
Visa policy of Kosovo Kosovo Visa not required - may enter with an ID card (90 days) Visa not required (90 days) Visa required

== Visa exemption ==
=== Ordinary passports ===
Citizens of the following countries and territories may enter Kosovo without a visa for up to 90 days within any 6-month period:

- All European Union member states^{ID}

- Albania^{ID}
- Andorra
- Antigua and Barbuda
- Argentina
- Australia
- Bahamas
- Bahrain
- Barbados
- Belize
- Bosnia and Herzegovina^{ID}
- Botswana
- Brazil
- Brunei
- Canada
- Chile
- Colombia
- Costa Rica
- Dominica
- El Salvador
- Eswatini
- Fiji
- Grenada
- Guatemala
- Guyana
- Honduras
- Hong Kong
- Iceland^{ID}
- Israel
- Japan
- Jordan
- Kiribati
- Kuwait
- Lesotho
- Liechtenstein^{ID}
- Macau
- Malawi
- Malaysia
- Maldives
- Marshall Islands
- Mauritius
- Mexico
- Micronesia
- Monaco^{ID}
- Montenegro^{ID}
- Namibia
- Nauru
- New Zealand
- Nicaragua
- North Macedonia^{ID}
- Norway^{ID}
- Oman
- Palau
- Panama
- Papua New Guinea
- Paraguay
- Qatar
- Saint Kitts and Nevis
- Saint Lucia
- Saint Vincent and the Grenadines
- Samoa
- San Marino^{ID}
- Sao Tome and Principe
- Saudi Arabia
- Serbia^{ID^{A}}
- Seychelles
- Singapore
- Solomon Islands
- South Africa
- South Korea
- Switzerland^{ID}
- Taiwan
- Timor-Leste
- Tonga
- Trinidad and Tobago
- Turkey
- Tuvalu
- Ukraine
- United Arab Emirates
- United Kingdom
- United States
- Uruguay
- Vanuatu
- Vatican City
- Venezuela

^{ID - May enter with a biometric ID card (including Irish passport card) in lieu of a passport.}
^{ID^{A} - May enter only with a biometric ID card. Serbian passports are not valid for entry into Kosovo.}
^{ID^{B} - May enter with a biometric national ID card in lieu of a passport.}

==== Substitute visa ====
Holders of a multiple-entry visa or residence permit issued by any Schengen Area member state may enter Kosovo without a visa for up to 15 days.

=== Non-ordinary passports ===
In addition to countries whose citizens are visa-exempt, holders of diplomatic or service/official passports of China, Egypt, Indonesia and Russia may enter Kosovo without a visa for up to 15 days.

Holders of diplomatic or service/official passports of Thailand may enter Kosovo without a visa for up to 90 days.

Holders of a Laissez-Passer issued by the United Nations traveling on duty may enter Kosovo without a visa.

== See also ==
- Foreign relations of Kosovo
- Kosovan passport
- Visa requirements for Kosovan citizens
