= Comparison of alphabetic country codes =

This is a comparison of the IOC, FIFA, and ISO 3166-1 three-letter codes, combined into one table for easy reference. Highlighted rows indicate those entries in which the three-letter codes differ from column to column. The last column indicates the number of codes present followed by letters to indicate which codes are present (O for Olympic, F for FIFA, and I for ISO) and dashes when a code is absent; capital letters indicate codes which match; stylised lower case letters indicate codes which differ.

== Ambiguities ==
Currently, the only ambiguous trigraph between IOC, FIFA and ISO codes is:

- BRN - IOC code for Bahrain (Note: ISO and FIFA code BHR) and ISO code for Brunei (Note: IOC and FIFA code BRU)

Historically, ambiguous trigraphs include:

- ANT - IOC code for Antigua and Barbuda, (Note: current ISO and FIFA code ATG) and historical ISO and FIFA code for the Netherlands Antilles (Note: IOC code AHO from French Antilles hollandaises) (until 2010) (Note: The Netherlands Antilles as a constituent country of the Netherlands was dissolved in 2010, with all island territories remaining a part of the Kingdom of the Netherlands but with various legal statuses.)
- BUR - IOC code for Burkina Faso (Note: ISO and FIFA code BFA) (since 1984), (Note: previously Burkina Faso was Upper Volta, and the IOC code was VOL, the ISO code HVO, from French Haute-Volta and the FIFA code UPV) and historical ISO and FIFA code for Burma (Note: IOC code BIR, from French Birmanie) (until 1989) (Note: at which point Burma became Myanmar and the FIFA and IOC codes became MYA, while the ISO code became MMR)

In the following cases, a code for a historical country or territory matches a modern code of the country it merged into:

- VNM - historical IOC and ISO code for South Vietnam, (Note: FIFA code VSO) became the ISO code for unified Vietnam (Note: current IOC and FIFA code VIE)
- YEM - historical ISO code for the North Yemen, (Note: IOC and FIFA code YAR, from Yemen Arab Republic) became the generally accepted code for unified Yemen

Including other lists of country three-letter-codes increases the number of ambiguities. For example:

- AUS - IOC, FIFA and ISO code for Australia, but UNDP code for Austria (Australia is AUL there)

== List ==
This list only includes nations or territories that have been assigned at least one of these three types of country codes. For a more complete list of countries, see list of countries.

Flag	Country	IOC	FIFA	ISO	*
(Afghanistan)	Afghanistan	AFG	AFG	AFG	3OFI
(Åland)	Åland			ALA	1--ï
(Albania)	Albania	ALB	ALB	ALB	3OFI
(Algeria)	Algeria	ALG	ALG	DZA	3OFï
(American Samoa)	American Samoa	ASA	ASA	ASM	3OFï
(Andorra)	Andorra	AND	AND	AND	3OFI
(Angola)	Angola	ANG	ANG	AGO	3OFï
(Anguilla)	Anguilla		AIA	AIA	2-FI
(Antarctica)	Antarctica			ATA	1--ï
(Antigua and Barbuda)	Antigua and Barbuda	ANT	ATG	ATG	3öFI
(Argentina)	Argentina	ARG	ARG	ARG	3OFI
(Armenia)	Armenia	ARM	ARM	ARM	3OFI
(Aruba)	Aruba	ARU	ARU	ABW	3OFï
(Australia)	Australia	AUS	AUS	AUS	3OFI
(Austria)	Austria	AUT	AUT	AUT	3OFI
(Azerbaijan)	Azerbaijan	AZE	AZE	AZE	3OFI
(The Bahamas)	The Bahamas	BAH	BAH	BHS	3OFï
(Bahrain)	Bahrain	BRN	BHR	BHR	3öFI
(Bangladesh)	Bangladesh	BAN	BAN	BGD	3OFï
(Barbados)	Barbados	BAR	BRB	BRB	3öFI
(Belarus)	Belarus	BLR	BLR	BLR	3OFI
(Belgium)	Belgium	BEL	BEL	BEL	3OFI
(Belize)	Belize	BIZ	BLZ	BLZ	3öFI
(Benin)	Benin	BEN	BEN	BEN	3OFI
(Bermuda)	Bermuda	BER	BER	BMU	3OFï
(Bhutan)	Bhutan	BHU	BHU	BTN	3OFï
(Bolivia)	Bolivia	BOL	BOL	BOL	3OFI
(Caribbean Netherlands)	Caribbean Netherlands: Bonaire, Sint Eustatius and Saba			BES	1--ï
(Bosnia and Herzegovina)	Bosnia and Herzegovina	BIH	BIH	BIH	3OFI
(Botswana)	Botswana	BOT	BOT	BWA	3OFï
(Bouvet Island)	Bouvet Island			BVT	1--ï
(Brazil)	Brazil	BRA	BRA	BRA	3OFI
(British Indian Ocean Territory)	British Indian Ocean Territory			IOT	1--ï
(British Virgin Islands)	British Virgin Islands	IVB	VGB	VGB	3öFI
(Brunei)	Brunei	BRU	BRU	BRN	3OFï
(Bulgaria)	Bulgaria	BUL	BUL	BGR	3OFï
(Burkina Faso)	Burkina Faso	BUR	BFA	BFA	3öFI
(Burundi)	Burundi	BDI	BDI	BDI	3OFI
(Cambodia)	Cambodia	CAM	CAM	KHM	3OFï
(Cameroon)	Cameroon	CMR	CMR	CMR	3OFI
(Canada)	Canada	CAN	CAN	CAN	3OFI
(Cape Verde)	Cape Verde	CPV	CPV	CPV	3OFI
(Cayman Islands)	Cayman Islands	CAY	CAY	CYM	3OFï
(Central African Republic)	Central African Republic	CAF	CTA	CAF	3OƒI
(Chad)	Chad	CHA	CHA	TCD	3OFï
(Chile)	Chile	CHI	CHI	CHL	3OFï
(China)	China, People's Republic of	CHN	CHN	CHN	3OFI
(Christmas Island)	Christmas Island			CXR	1--ï
(Cocos (Keeling) Islands)	Cocos (Keeling) Islands			CCK	1--ï
(Colombia)	Colombia	COL	COL	COL	3OFI
(Comoros)	Comoros	COM	COM	COM	3OFI
(Democratic Republic of the Congo)	Congo, Democratic Republic of the	COD	COD	COD	3OFI
(Republic of the Congo)	Congo, Republic of the	CGO	CGO	COG	3OFï
(Cook Islands)	Cook Islands	COK	COK	COK	3OFI
(Costa Rica)	Costa Rica	CRC	CRC	CRI	3OFï
(Ivory Coast)	Côte d'Ivoire	CIV	CIV	CIV	3OFI
(Croatia)	Croatia	CRO	CRO	HRV	3OFï
(Cuba)	Cuba	CUB	CUB	CUB	3OFI
(Curaçao)	Curaçao		CUW	CUW	2-FI
(Cyprus)	Cyprus	CYP	CYP	CYP	3OFI
(Czech Republic)	Czech Republic	CZE	CZE	CZE	3OFI
(Denmark)	Denmark	DEN	DEN	DNK	3OFï
(Djibouti)	Djibouti	DJI	DJI	DJI	3OFI
(Dominica)	Dominica	DMA	DMA	DMA	3OFI
(Dominican Republic)	Dominican Republic	DOM	DOM	DOM	3OFI
(Ecuador)	Ecuador	ECU	ECU	ECU	3OFI
(Egypt)	Egypt	EGY	EGY	EGY	3OFI
(El Salvador)	El Salvador	ESA	SLV	SLV	3öFI
(England)	England		ENG		1-ƒ-
(Equatorial Guinea)	Equatorial Guinea	GEQ	EQG	GNQ	3öƒï
(Eritrea)	Eritrea	ERI	ERI	ERI	3OFI
(Estonia)	Estonia	EST	EST	EST	3OFI
(Eswatini)	Eswatini	SWZ	SWZ	SWZ	3OFI
(Ethiopia)	Ethiopia	ETH	ETH	ETH	3OFI
(Falkland Islands)	Falkland Islands			FLK	1--ï
(Faroe Islands)	Faroe Islands		FRO	FRO	2-FI
(Fiji)	Fiji	FIJ	FIJ	FJI	3OFï
(Finland)	Finland	FIN	FIN	FIN	3OFI
(France)	France	FRA	FRA	FRA	3OFI
(French Guiana)	French Guiana			GUF	1--ï
(French Polynesia)	French Polynesia		TAH	PYF	2-ƒï
(French Southern and Antarctic Lands)	French Southern and Antarctic Lands			ATF	1--ï
(Gabon)	Gabon	GAB	GAB	GAB	3OFI
(The Gambia)	The Gambia	GAM	GAM	GMB	3OFï
(Georgia (country))	Georgia	GEO	GEO	GEO	3OFI
(Germany)	Germany	GER	GER	DEU	3OFï
(Ghana)	Ghana	GHA	GHA	GHA	3OFI
(Gibraltar)	Gibraltar		GIB	GIB	2-FI
(Greece)	Greece	GRE	GRE	GRC	3OFï
(Greenland)	Greenland			GRL	1--ï
(Grenada)	Grenada	GRN	GRN	GRD	3OFï
(Guadeloupe)	Guadeloupe			GLP	1--ï
(Guam)	Guam	GUM	GUM	GUM	3OFI
(Guatemala)	Guatemala	GUA	GUA	GTM	3OFï
(Bailiwick of Guernsey)	Guernsey			GGY	1--ï
(Guinea)	Guinea	GUI	GUI	GIN	3OFï
(Guinea-Bissau)	Guinea-Bissau	GBS	GNB	GNB	3öFI
(Guyana)	Guyana	GUY	GUY	GUY	3OFI
(Haiti)	Haiti	HAI	HAI	HTI	3OFï
(Australia)	Heard Island and McDonald Islands			HMD	1--ï
(Honduras)	Honduras	HON	HON	HND	3OFï
(Hong Kong)	Hong Kong	HKG	HKG	HKG	3OFI
(Hungary)	Hungary	HUN	HUN	HUN	3OFI
(Iceland)	Iceland	ISL	ISL	ISL	3OFI
(India)	India	IND	IND	IND	3OFI
(Indonesia)	Indonesia	INA	IDN	IDN	3öFI
(Iran)	Iran	IRI	IRN	IRN	3öFI
(Iraq)	Iraq	IRQ	IRQ	IRQ	3OFI
(Republic of Ireland)	Ireland	IRL	IRL	IRL	3OFI
(Isle of Man)	Isle of Man			IMN	1--ï
(Israel)	Israel	ISR	ISR	ISR	3OFI
(Italy)	Italy	ITA	ITA	ITA	3OFI
(Jamaica)	Jamaica	JAM	JAM	JAM	3OFI
(Japan)	Japan	JPN	JPN	JPN	3OFI
(Jersey)	Jersey			JEY	1--ï
(Jordan)	Jordan	JOR	JOR	JOR	3OFI
(Kazakhstan)	Kazakhstan	KAZ	KAZ	KAZ	3OFI
(Kenya)	Kenya	KEN	KEN	KEN	3OFI
(Kiribati)	Kiribati	KIR		KIR	2O-I
(North Korea)	Korea, Democratic People's Rep. (North)	PRK	PRK	PRK	3OFI
(South Korea)	Korea, Republic of (South)	KOR	KOR	KOR	3OFI
(Kosovo)	Kosovo	KOS	KOS		2OF-
(Kuwait)	Kuwait	KUW	KUW	KWT	3OFï
(Kyrgyzstan)	Kyrgyzstan	KGZ	KGZ	KGZ	3OFI
(Laos)	Laos	LAO	LAO	LAO	3OFI
(Latvia)	Latvia	LAT	LVA	LVA	3öFI
(Lebanon)	Lebanon	LBN	LBN	LBN	3OFI
(Lesotho)	Lesotho	LES	LES	LSO	3OFï
(Liberia)	Liberia	LBR	LBR	LBR	3OFI
(Libya)	Libya	LBA	LBY	LBY	3öFI
(Liechtenstein)	Liechtenstein	LIE	LIE	LIE	3OFI
(Lithuania)	Lithuania	LTU	LTU	LTU	3OFI
(Luxembourg)	Luxembourg	LUX	LUX	LUX	3OFI
(Macau)	Macau		MAC	MAC	2-FI
(Madagascar)	Madagascar	MAD	MAD	MDG	3OFï
(Malawi)	Malawi	MAW	MWI	MWI	3öFI
(Malaysia)	Malaysia	MAS	MAS	MYS	3OFï
(Maldives)	Maldives	MDV	MDV	MDV	3OFI
(Mali)	Mali	MLI	MLI	MLI	3OFI
(Malta)	Malta	MLT	MLT	MLT	3OFI
(Marshall Islands)	Marshall Islands	MHL		MHL	2O-I
(Martinique)	Martinique			MTQ	1--ï
(Mauritania)	Mauritania	MTN	MTN	MRT	3OFï
(Mauritius)	Mauritius	MRI	MRI	MUS	3OFï
(Mayotte)	Mayotte			MYT	1--ï
(Mexico)	Mexico	MEX	MEX	MEX	3OFI
(Federated States of Micronesia)	Micronesia, Federated States of	FSM		FSM	2O-I
(Moldova)	Moldova	MDA	MDA	MDA	3OFI
(Monaco)	Monaco	MON		MCO	2ö-ï
(Mongolia)	Mongolia	MGL	MNG	MNG	3öFI
(Montenegro)	Montenegro	MNE	MNE	MNE	3OFI
(Montserrat)	Montserrat		MSR	MSR	2-FI
(Morocco)	Morocco	MAR	MAR	MAR	3OFI
(Mozambique)	Mozambique	MOZ	MOZ	MOZ	3OFI
(Myanmar)	Myanmar	MYA	MYA	MMR	3OFï
(Namibia)	Namibia	NAM	NAM	NAM	3OFI
(Nauru)	Nauru	NRU		NRU	2O-I
(Nepal)	Nepal	NEP	NEP	NPL	3OFï
(Netherlands)	Netherlands	NED	NED	NLD	3OFï
(New Caledonia)	New Caledonia		NCL	NCL	2-FI
(New Zealand)	New Zealand	NZL	NZL	NZL	3OFI
(Nicaragua)	Nicaragua	NCA	NCA	NIC	3OFï
(Niger)	Niger	NIG	NIG	NER	3OFï
(Nigeria)	Nigeria	NGR	NGA	NGA	3öFI
(Niue)	Niue			NIU	1--ï
(Norfolk Island)	Norfolk Island			NFK	1--ï
	Northern Ireland		NIR		1-ƒ-
(Northern Mariana Islands)	Northern Mariana Islands			MNP	1--ï
(North Macedonia)	North Macedonia	MKD	MKD	MKD	3OFI
(Norway)	Norway	NOR	NOR	NOR	3OFI
(Oman)	Oman	OMA	OMA	OMN	3OFï
(Pakistan)	Pakistan	PAK	PAK	PAK	3OFI
(Palau)	Palau	PLW		PLW	2O-I
(Palestine)	Palestine	PLE	PLE	PSE	3OFï
(Panama)	Panama	PAN	PAN	PAN	3OFI
(Papua New Guinea)	Papua New Guinea	PNG	PNG	PNG	3OFI
(Paraguay)	Paraguay	PAR	PAR	PRY	3OFï
(Peru)	Peru	PER	PER	PER	3OFI
(Philippines)	Philippines	PHI	PHI	PHL	3OFï
(Pitcairn Islands)	Pitcairn Islands			PCN	1--ï
(Poland)	Poland	POL	POL	POL	3OFI
(Portugal)	Portugal	POR	POR	PRT	3OFï
(Puerto Rico)	Puerto Rico	PUR	PUR	PRI	3OFï
(Qatar)	Qatar	QAT	QAT	QAT	3OFI
(Réunion)	Réunion			REU	1--ï
(Romania)	Romania	ROU	ROU	ROU	3OFI
(Russia)	Russian Federation	RUS	RUS	RUS	3OFI
(Rwanda)	Rwanda	RWA	RWA	RWA	3OFI
(Saint Barthélemy)	Saint Barthélemy			BLM	1--ï
(Saint Helena, Ascension and Tristan da Cunha)	Saint Helena, Ascension and Tristan da Cunha			SHN	1--ï
(Saint Kitts and Nevis)	Saint Kitts and Nevis	SKN	SKN	KNA	3OFï
(Saint Lucia)	Saint Lucia	LCA	LCA	LCA	3OFI
(Collectivity of Saint Martin)	Saint Martin (French part)			MAF	1--ï
(Saint Pierre and Miquelon)	Saint Pierre and Miquelon			SPM	1--ï
(Saint Vincent and the Grenadines)	Saint Vincent and the Grenadines	VIN	VIN	VCT	3OFï
(Samoa)	Samoa	SAM	SAM	WSM	3OFï
(San Marino)	San Marino	SMR	SMR	SMR	3OFI
(São Tomé and Príncipe)	São Tomé and Príncipe	STP	STP	STP	3OFI
(Saudi Arabia)	Saudi Arabia	KSA	KSA	SAU	3OFï
(Scotland)	Scotland		SCO		1-ƒ-
(Senegal)	Senegal	SEN	SEN	SEN	3OFI
(Serbia)	Serbia	SRB	SRB	SRB	3OFI
(Seychelles)	Seychelles	SEY	SEY	SYC	3OFï
(Sierra Leone)	Sierra Leone	SLE	SLE	SLE	3OFI
(Singapore)	Singapore	SGP	SGP	SGP	3OFI
(Sint Maarten)	Sint Maarten (Dutch part)			SXM	1--ï
(Slovakia)	Slovakia	SVK	SVK	SVK	3OFI
(Slovenia)	Slovenia	SLO	SVN	SVN	3öFI
(Solomon Islands)	Solomon Islands	SOL	SOL	SLB	3OFï
(Somalia)	Somalia	SOM	SOM	SOM	3OFI
(South Africa)	South Africa	RSA	RSA	ZAF	3OFï
(South Georgia and the South Sandwich Islands)	South Georgia and the South Sandwich Islands			SGS	1--ï
(South Sudan)	South Sudan	SSD	SSD	SSD	3OFI
(Spain)	Spain	ESP	ESP	ESP	3OFI
(Sri Lanka)	Sri Lanka	SRI	SRI	LKA	3OFï
(Sudan)	Sudan	SUD	SDN	SDN	3öFI
(Suriname)	Suriname	SUR	SUR	SUR	3OFI
(Svalbard and Jan Mayen)	Svalbard and Jan Mayen			SJM	1--ï
(Sweden)	Sweden	SWE	SWE	SWE	3OFI
(Switzerland)	Switzerland	SUI	SUI	CHE	3OFï
(Syria)	Syria	SYR	SYR	SYR	3OFI
(Taiwan)	Taiwan	TPE	TPE	TWN	3OFï
(Tajikistan)	Tajikistan	TJK	TJK	TJK	3OFI
(Tanzania)	Tanzania	TAN	TAN	TZA	3OFï
(Thailand)	Thailand	THA	THA	THA	3OFI
(Timor-Leste)	Timor-Leste	TLS	TLS	TLS	3OFI
(Togo)	Togo	TOG	TOG	TGO	3OFï
(Tokelau)	Tokelau			TKL	1--ï
(Tonga)	Tonga	TGA	TGA	TON	3OFï
(Trinidad and Tobago)	Trinidad and Tobago	TTO	TRI	TTO	3OƒI
(Tunisia)	Tunisia	TUN	TUN	TUN	3OFI
(Turkey)	Turkey	TUR	TUR	TUR	3OFI
(Turkmenistan)	Turkmenistan	TKM	TKM	TKM	3OFI
(Turks and Caicos Islands)	Turks and Caicos Islands		TCA	TCA	2-FI
(Tuvalu)	Tuvalu	TUV		TUV	2O-I
(Uganda)	Uganda	UGA	UGA	UGA	3OFI
(Ukraine)	Ukraine	UKR	UKR	UKR	3OFI
(United Arab Emirates)	United Arab Emirates	UAE	UAE	ARE	3OFï
(United Kingdom)	United Kingdom	GBR		GBR	2O-I
(United States)	United States	USA	USA	USA	3OFI
(United States)	United States Minor Outlying Islands			UMI	1--ï
(United States Virgin Islands)	United States Virgin Islands	ISV	VIR	VIR	3öFI
(Uruguay)	Uruguay	URU	URU	URY	3OFï
(Uzbekistan)	Uzbekistan	UZB	UZB	UZB	3OFI
(Vanuatu)	Vanuatu	VAN	VAN	VUT	3OFï
(Vatican City)	Vatican City State			VAT	1--ï
(Venezuela)	Venezuela	VEN	VEN	VEN	3OFI
(Vietnam)	Vietnam	VIE	VIE	VNM	3OFï
(Wales)	Wales		WAL		1-ƒ-
(Wallis and Futuna)	Wallis and Futuna			WLF	1--ï
(Western Sahara)	Western Sahara			ESH	1--ï
(Yemen)	Yemen	YEM	YEM	YEM	3OFI
(Zambia)	Zambia	ZAM	ZAM	ZMB	3OFï
(Zimbabwe)	Zimbabwe	ZIM	ZIM	ZWE	3OFï

*
Explanation of comparison codes in the final column:

3/2/1 The number of assigned codes
O(ö) IOC code is (isn't) identical to another code
F(ƒ) FIFA code is (isn't) identical to another code
I(ï) ISO code is (isn't) identical to another code

3OFI	IOC, FIFA and ISO codes are all identical to each other
3OFï	IOC and FIFA codes are identical; ISO code is different
3OƒI	IOC and ISO codes are identical; FIFA code is different
3öFI	FIFA and ISO codes are identical; IOC code is different
3öƒï	IOC, FIFA and ISO codes are all different from each other
2OF-	IOC and FIFA codes are identical; ISO code not assigned
2O-I	IOC and ISO codes are identical; FIFA code not assigned
2ö-ï	IOC and ISO codes are different; FIFA code not assigned
2-FI	FIFA and ISO codes are identical; IOC code not assigned
2-ƒï	FIFA and ISO codes are different; IOC code not assigned
1-ƒ-	Only FIFA code exists
1--ï	Only ISO code exists

== Former countries, former country names and former country codes ==
Codes are shown with their last year of use.

Flag	Country	IOC	FIFA	ISO
(British Honduras)	British Honduras	HBR 1972	BHO	
(Myanmar)	Burma	BIR 1988	BUR 1989	BUR 1989
(Dominion of Ceylon)	Ceylon	CEY 1972	CEY 1972	
(Republic of Dahomey)	Dahomey	DAH 1972	DAH 1975	DHY 1977
(Czechoslovakia)	Czechoslovakia	TCH 1992	TCH 1993	CSK 1993
(East Germany)	East Germany	GDR 1988	GDR 1990	DDR 1990
(Cambodia)	Khmer Republic	KHM 1976	CAM current	KHM 1975
(Kosovo)	Kosovo	KOS current	KVX 2022	
(Lebanon)	Lebanon	LIB 2016	LIB 2020	LBN current
(Federation of Malaya)	Malaya	MAL 1960	MAL 1963	
(Netherlands)	Netherlands	HOL 1988	HOL 19??	NLD current
(Netherlands Antilles)	Netherlands Antilles	AHO 2010	ANT 2010	ANT 2010
(Crown Colony of North Borneo)	North Borneo	NBO 1956	NBO 1963	
(Yemen Arab Republic)	North Yemen	YAR 1988	NYE 1990	YEM 1990
(Northern Rhodesia)	Northern Rhodesia	NRH 1964	NRH 1964	
(Rhodesia)	Rhodesia	RHO 1972	RHO 1980	RHO 1980
(Romania)	Romania	ROM 2006	ROM 2005	ROM 2002
(Saar Protectorate)	Saarland	SAA 1952	SAA 1956	
(Serbia and Montenegro)	Serbia and Montenegro	SCG 2006	SCG 2006	SCG 2006
(Singapore)	Singapore	SIN 2016	SIN 2022	SGP current
(South Yemen)	South Yemen	YMD 1988	SYE 1990	YMD 1990
(Soviet Union)	Soviet Union	URS 1988	URS 1991	SUN 1992
(Sudan)	Sudan	SUD current	SUD 2012	SDN current
(Trinidad and Tobago)	Trinidad and Tobago	TRI 2012	TRI current	TTO current
(United Arab Republic)	United Arab Republic	UAR 1968	UAR 1971	
(Republic of Upper Volta)	Upper Volta	VOL 1984	UPV 1984	HVO 1984
(North Vietnam)	Vietnam, Democratic Republic of	n.a.	VNO 1975	VDR 1977
(South Vietnam)	Vietnam, Republic of	VNM 1976	VSO 1975	VNM 1977
(Germany)	West Germany	FRG 1988	FRG 1990	DEU 1990
(Samoa)	Western Samoa	SAM 1996	WSM 1997	WSM 1997
(Federal Republic of Yugoslavia)	Yugoslavia, Federal Republic of	YUG 2002	YUG 2003	YUG 2003
(Socialist Federal Republic of Yugoslavia)	Yugoslavia, Socialist Federal Republic of	YUG 1992	YUG 1992	YUG 1992
(Zaire)	Zaire	ZAI 1996	ZAI 1997	ZAR 1997

== See also ==
- List of IOC country codes
- List of FIFA country codes
- ISO 3166-1 alpha-3
- List of ISO 3166 country codes
