= ISO 3166-1 alpha-3 =

Three-letter country codes defined in ISO 3166-1

ISO 3166-1 alpha-3 codes are three-letter country codes defined in ISO 3166-1, part of the ISO 3166 standard published by the International Organization for Standardization (ISO), to represent countries, dependent territories, and special areas of geographical interest. They allow a better visual association between the codes and the country names than the two-letter alpha-2 codes (the third set of codes is numeric and hence offers no visual association). They were first included as part of the ISO 3166 standard in its first edition in 1974.

== Uses and applications ==
The ISO 3166-1 alpha-3 codes are used most prominently in ISO/IEC 7501-1 for machine-readable passports, as standardized by the International Civil Aviation Organization, with a number of additional codes for special passports; some of these codes are currently reserved and not used at the present stage in ISO 3166-1.

The United Nations uses a combination of ISO 3166-1 alpha-2 and alpha-3 codes, along with codes that pre-date the creation of ISO 3166, for international vehicle registration codes, which are codes used to identify the issuing country of a vehicle registration plate; some of these codes are currently indeterminately reserved in ISO 3166-1.

== Current codes ==
=== Officially assigned code elements ===
The following is a complete list of the current officially assigned ISO 3166-1 alpha-3 codes, using a title case version of the English short names officially defined by the ISO 3166 Maintenance Agency (ISO 3166/MA):

- ABW Aruba
- AFG Afghanistan
- AGO Angola
- AIA Anguilla
- ALA Åland Islands
- ALB Albania
- AND Andorra
- ARE United Arab Emirates
- ARG Argentina
- ARM Armenia
- ASM American Samoa
- ATA Antarctica
- ATF French Southern Territories
- ATG Antigua and Barbuda
- AUS Australia
- AUT Austria
- AZE Azerbaijan
- BDI Burundi
- BEL Belgium
- BEN Benin
- BES Bonaire, Sint Eustatius and Saba
- BFA Burkina Faso
- BGD Bangladesh
- BGR Bulgaria
- BHR Bahrain
- BHS Bahamas
- BIH Bosnia and Herzegovina
- BLM Saint Barthélemy
- BLR Belarus
- BLZ Belize
- BMU Bermuda
- BOL Bolivia, Plurinational State of
- BRA Brazil
- BRB Barbados
- BRN Brunei Darussalam
- BTN Bhutan
- BVT Bouvet Island
- BWA Botswana
- CAF Central African Republic
- CAN Canada
- CCK Cocos (Keeling) Islands
- CHE Switzerland
- CHL Chile
- CHN China
- CIV Côte d'Ivoire
- CMR Cameroon
- COD Congo, Democratic Republic of the
- COG Congo
- COK Cook Islands
- COL Colombia
- COM Comoros
- CPV Cabo Verde
- CRI Costa Rica
- CUB Cuba
- CUW Curaçao
- CXR Christmas Island
- CYM Cayman Islands
- CYP Cyprus
- CZE Czechia
- DEU Germany
- DJI Djibouti
- DMA Dominica
- DNK Denmark
- DOM Dominican Republic
- DZA Algeria
- ECU Ecuador
- EGY Egypt
- ERI Eritrea
- ESH Western Sahara
- ESP Spain
- EST Estonia
- ETH Ethiopia
- FIN Finland
- FJI Fiji
- FLK Falkland Islands (Malvinas)
- FRA France
- FRO Faroe Islands
- FSM Micronesia, Federated States of
- GAB Gabon
- GBR United Kingdom of Great Britain and Northern Ireland
- GEO Georgia
- GGY Guernsey
- GHA Ghana
- GIB Gibraltar
- GIN Guinea
- GLP Guadeloupe
- GMB Gambia
- GNB Guinea-Bissau
- GNQ Equatorial Guinea
- GRC Greece
- GRD Grenada
- GRL Greenland
- GTM Guatemala
- GUF French Guiana
- GUM Guam
- GUY Guyana
- HKG Hong Kong
- HMD Heard Island and McDonald Islands
- HND Honduras
- HRV Croatia
- HTI Haiti
- HUN Hungary
- IDN Indonesia
- IMN Isle of Man
- IND India
- IOT British Indian Ocean Territory
- IRL Ireland
- IRN Iran, Islamic Republic of
- IRQ Iraq
- ISL Iceland
- ISR Israel
- ITA Italy
- JAM Jamaica
- JEY Jersey
- JOR Jordan
- JPN Japan
- KAZ Kazakhstan
- KEN Kenya
- KGZ Kyrgyzstan
- KHM Cambodia
- KIR Kiribati
- KNA Saint Kitts and Nevis
- KOR Korea, Republic of
- KWT Kuwait
- LAO Lao People's Democratic Republic
- LBN Lebanon
- LBR Liberia
- LBY Libya
- LCA Saint Lucia
- LIE Liechtenstein
- LKA Sri Lanka
- LSO Lesotho
- LTU Lithuania
- LUX Luxembourg
- LVA Latvia
- MAC Macao
- MAF Saint Martin (French part)
- MAR Morocco
- MCO Monaco
- MDA Moldova, Republic of
- MDG Madagascar
- MDV Maldives
- MEX Mexico
- MHL Marshall Islands
- MKD North Macedonia
- MLI Mali
- MLT Malta
- MMR Myanmar
- MNE Montenegro
- MNG Mongolia
- MNP Northern Mariana Islands
- MOZ Mozambique
- MRT Mauritania
- MSR Montserrat
- MTQ Martinique
- MUS Mauritius
- MWI Malawi
- MYS Malaysia
- MYT Mayotte
- NAM Namibia
- NCL New Caledonia
- NER Niger
- NFK Norfolk Island
- NGA Nigeria
- NIC Nicaragua
- NIU Niue
- NLD Netherlands, Kingdom of the
- NOR Norway
- NPL Nepal
- NRU Naoero
- NZL New Zealand
- OMN Oman
- PAK Pakistan
- PAN Panama
- PCN Pitcairn
- PER Peru
- PHL Philippines
- PLW Palau
- PNG Papua New Guinea
- POL Poland
- PRI Puerto Rico
- PRK Korea, Democratic People's Republic of
- PRT Portugal
- PRY Paraguay
- PSE Palestine, State of
- PYF French Polynesia
- QAT Qatar
- REU Réunion
- ROU Romania
- RUS Russian Federation
- RWA Rwanda
- SAU Saudi Arabia
- SDN Sudan
- SEN Senegal
- SGP Singapore
- SGS South Georgia and the South Sandwich Islands
- SHN Saint Helena, Ascension and Tristan da Cunha
- SJM Svalbard and Jan Mayen
- SLB Solomon Islands
- SLE Sierra Leone
- SLV El Salvador
- SMR San Marino
- SOM Somalia
- SPM Saint Pierre and Miquelon
- SRB Serbia
- SSD South Sudan
- STP Sao Tome and Principe
- SUR Suriname
- SVK Slovakia
- SVN Slovenia
- SWE Sweden
- SWZ Eswatini
- SXM Sint Maarten (Dutch part)
- SYC Seychelles
- SYR Syrian Arab Republic
- TCA Turks and Caicos Islands
- TCD Chad
- TGO Togo
- THA Thailand
- TJK Tajikistan
- TKL Tokelau
- TKM Turkmenistan
- TLS Timor-Leste
- TON Tonga
- TTO Trinidad and Tobago
- TUN Tunisia
- TUR Türkiye
- TUV Tuvalu
- TWN Taiwan, Province of China
- TZA Tanzania, United Republic of
- UGA Uganda
- UKR Ukraine
- UMI United States Minor Outlying Islands
- URY Uruguay
- USA United States of America
- UZB Uzbekistan
- VAT Holy See
- VCT Saint Vincent and the Grenadines
- VEN Venezuela, Bolivarian Republic of
- VGB Virgin Islands (British)
- VIR Virgin Islands (U.S.)
- VNM Viet Nam
- VUT Vanuatu
- WLF Wallis and Futuna
- WSM Samoa
- YEM Yemen
- ZAF South Africa
- ZMB Zambia
- ZWE Zimbabwe

=== User-assigned code elements ===
User-assigned code elements are codes at the disposal of users who need to add further names of countries, territories, or other geographical entities to their in-house application of ISO 3166-1, and the ISO 3166/MA will never use these codes in the updating process of the standard. The following alpha-3 codes can be user-assigned: AAA to AAZ, QMA to QZZ, XAA to XZZ, and ZZA to ZZZ.

==== Examples ====
The following codes are used in ISO/IEC 7501-1 for special machine-readable passports:

- XOM is used to represent the Sovereign Military Order of Malta
- XPO is used for Interpol travel documents
- XXA is used to represent a stateless person, as defined in Article 1 of the 1954 Convention Relating to the Status of Stateless Persons
- XXB is used to represent a refugee, as defined in Article 1 of the 1951 Convention Relating to the Status of Refugees as amended by the 1967 Protocol
- XXC is used to represent a refugee, other than as defined above
- XXX is used to represent a person of unspecified nationality

NATO STANAG 1059 INT is built upon ISO alpha-3 codes, but also defines alpha-2 codes incompatible with ISO 3166-1. It introduces several private use codes for fictional countries and organizational entities:

- XXB "Brownland"
- XXG "Greyland"
- XXI "Indigoland"
- XXL "Limeland"
- XXP "Purpleland"
- XXR "Redland"
- XXW "Whiteland"
- XXY "Yellowland"
- XXE SHAPE
- XXM NATO
- XXN NATO "Blue" Command
- XXS SACLANT

XKX is an ISO 3166-1 alpha-3 equivalent user-assigned code element for Kosovo in the European Union, and XKK is used in the Unicode standard.

=== Reserved code elements ===
Reserved code elements are codes which have become obsolete, or are required in order to enable a particular user application of the standard but do not qualify for inclusion in ISO 3166-1. To avoid transitional application problems and to aid users who require specific additional code elements for the functioning of their coding systems, the ISO 3166/MA, when justified, reserves these codes which it undertakes not to use for other than specified purposes during a limited or indeterminate period of time.

The reserved alpha-3 codes are divided into the following three categories: exceptional reservations, transitional reservations, and indeterminate reservations.

==== Exceptional reservations ====
Exceptionally reserved code elements are codes reserved at the request of national ISO member bodies, governments and international organizations, which are required in order to support a particular application, as specified by the requesting body and limited to such use; any further use of such code elements is subject to approval by the ISO 3166/MA. The following alpha-3 codes are currently exceptionally reserved:

- ASC Ascension Island – Reserved on request of Universal Postal Union (UPU), also used by International Telecommunication Union (ITU)
- CPT Clipperton Island – Reserved on request of ITU
- CRQ Sark – Reserved on request of the United Kingdom
- DGA Diego Garcia – Reserved on request of ITU
- FXX France, Metropolitan – Reserved on request of France; Officially assigned before being deleted from ISO 3166-1
- SUN USSR – From June 2008; Transitionally reserved from September 1992; Officially assigned before being deleted from ISO 3166-1
- TAA Tristan da Cunha – Reserved on request of UPU

The following alpha-3 codes were previously exceptionally reserved, but are now officially assigned:

- GGY Guernsey – Reserved on request of UPU
- IMN Isle of Man – Reserved on request of UPU
- JEY Jersey – Reserved on request of UPU

==== Transitional reservations ====
Transitional reserved code elements are codes reserved after their deletion from ISO 3166-1. These codes may be used only during a transitional period of at least five years while new code elements that may have replaced them are taken into use. These codes may be reassigned by the ISO 3166/MA after the expiration of the transitional period. The following alpha-3 codes are currently transitionally reserved:

- ANT Netherlands Antilles – From December 2010
- BUR Burma – From December 1989
- BYS Byelorussian SSR – From June 1992
- CSK Czechoslovakia – From June 1993
- NTZ Neutral Zone – From July 1993
- ROM Romania – From February 2002; Code changed to ROU
- SCG Serbia and Montenegro – From September 2006
- TMP East Timor – From May 2002
- YUG Yugoslavia – From July 2003
- ZAR Zaire – From July 1997

==== Indeterminate reservations ====
Indeterminately reserved code elements are reserved for use in a particular way, usually due to their presence in other coding systems. For example, several codes are reserved because they are used for international intellectual property organizations in WIPO Standard ST.3.

The following codes used to designate road vehicles are indeterminately reserved under the 1949 and 1968 United Nations Conventions on Road Traffic:

- ADN Aden
- BDS Barbados (current code BRB)
- BRU Brunei (current code BRN)
- CDN Canada (current code CAN)
- EAK Kenya (current code KEN)
- EAT Tanganyika [Part of Tanzania, United Republic of]
- EAU Uganda (current code UGA)
- EAZ Zanzibar [Part of Tanzania, United Republic of]
- GBA Alderney
- GBG Guernsey (current code GGY)
- GBJ Jersey (current code JEY)
- GBM Isle of Man (current code IMN)
- GBZ Gibraltar (current code GIB)
- GCA Guatemala (current code GTM)
- HKJ Jordan (current code JOR)
- MAL Malaysia (current code MYS)
- RCA Central African Republic (current code CAF)
- RCB Congo, People's Republic of (current code COG)
- RCH Chile (current code CHL)
- RMM Mali (current code MLI)
- RNR Zambia (current code ZMB)
- ROK Korea, Republic of (current code KOR)
- RSM San Marino (current code SMR)
- RSR Southern Rhodesia [now Zimbabwe]
- SLO Slovenia (current code SVN)
- SME Suriname (current code SUR)
- TMN Turkmenistan (current code TKM)
- WAG Gambia (current code GMB)
- WAL Sierra Leone (current code SLE)
- WAN Nigeria (current code NGA)
- ZRE Zaire (current code COD)

The following alpha-3 code was previously indeterminately reserved, but has been reassigned to another country as its official code:

- ROU Uruguay (current code URY) – Code reassigned to Romania

The following are used in ISO/IEC 7501-1 for special machine-readable passports:

- GBD identifies a British Passport holder who is a British Overseas Territories citizen
- GBN identifies a British Passport holder who is a British National (Overseas)
- GBO identifies a British Passport holder who is a British Overseas citizen
- GBP identifies a British Passport holder who is a British protected person
- GBS identifies a British Passport holder who is a British subject
- UNA is used as a substitute for nationality where the holder is an Official of a Specialized Agency of the UN Organization
- UNK identifies Kosovo residents to whom travel documents were issued by the United Nations Interim Administration in Kosovo (UNMIK)
- UNO is used to designate the UN Organization as the issuer and used as a substitute for nationality where the holder is an Official of the UN Organization

== Deleted codes ==
Besides the codes currently transitionally reserved and two other codes currently exceptionally reserved (FXX for France, Metropolitan and SUN for USSR), the following alpha-3 codes have also been deleted from ISO 3166-1:

- AFI French Afars and Issas
- ATB British Antarctic Territory
- ATN Dronning Maud Land
- CTE Canton and Enderbury Islands
- DDR German Democratic Republic
- DHY Dahomey
- GEL Gilbert and Ellice Islands
- HVO Upper Volta
- JTN Johnston Island
- MID Midway Islands
- NHB New Hebrides
- PCI Pacific Islands (Trust Territory)
- PCZ Panama Canal Zone
- PHI Philippines – Code changed to PHL in 1976
- PUS United States Miscellaneous Pacific Islands
- RHO Southern Rhodesia
- SKM Sikkim
- VDR Viet-Nam, Democratic Republic of
- WAK Wake Island
- YMD Yemen, Democratic

== See also ==
- List of IOC country codes, used by the International Olympic Committee (IOC)
- List of FIFA country codes, used by the Fédération Internationale de Football Association (FIFA)
- Comparison of alphabetic country codes

== Sources ==
- ISO 3166 Maintenance Agency, International Organization for Standardization (ISO)
  - Reserved code elements under ISO 3166-1 "Codes for the representation of names of countries and their subdivisions – Part 1: Country codes", available on request from ISO 3166/MA
- Standard Country or Area Codes for Statistical Use, United Nations Statistics Division
  - Countries or areas, codes and abbreviations – list of alpha-3 and numeric codes (a few territories officially assigned codes in ISO 3166-1 are not included in this list)
- The World Factbook (public domain), Central Intelligence Agency
  - Appendix D – Country Data Codes – comparison of FIPS 10, ISO 3166, and STANAG 1059 country codes
- Administrative Divisions of Countries ("Statoids"), Statoids.com
  - Country codes – comparison of ISO 3166-1 country codes with other country codes
  - ISO 3166-1 Change History, Statoids.com
