= Musa Hoti =

Kosovan teacher and activist

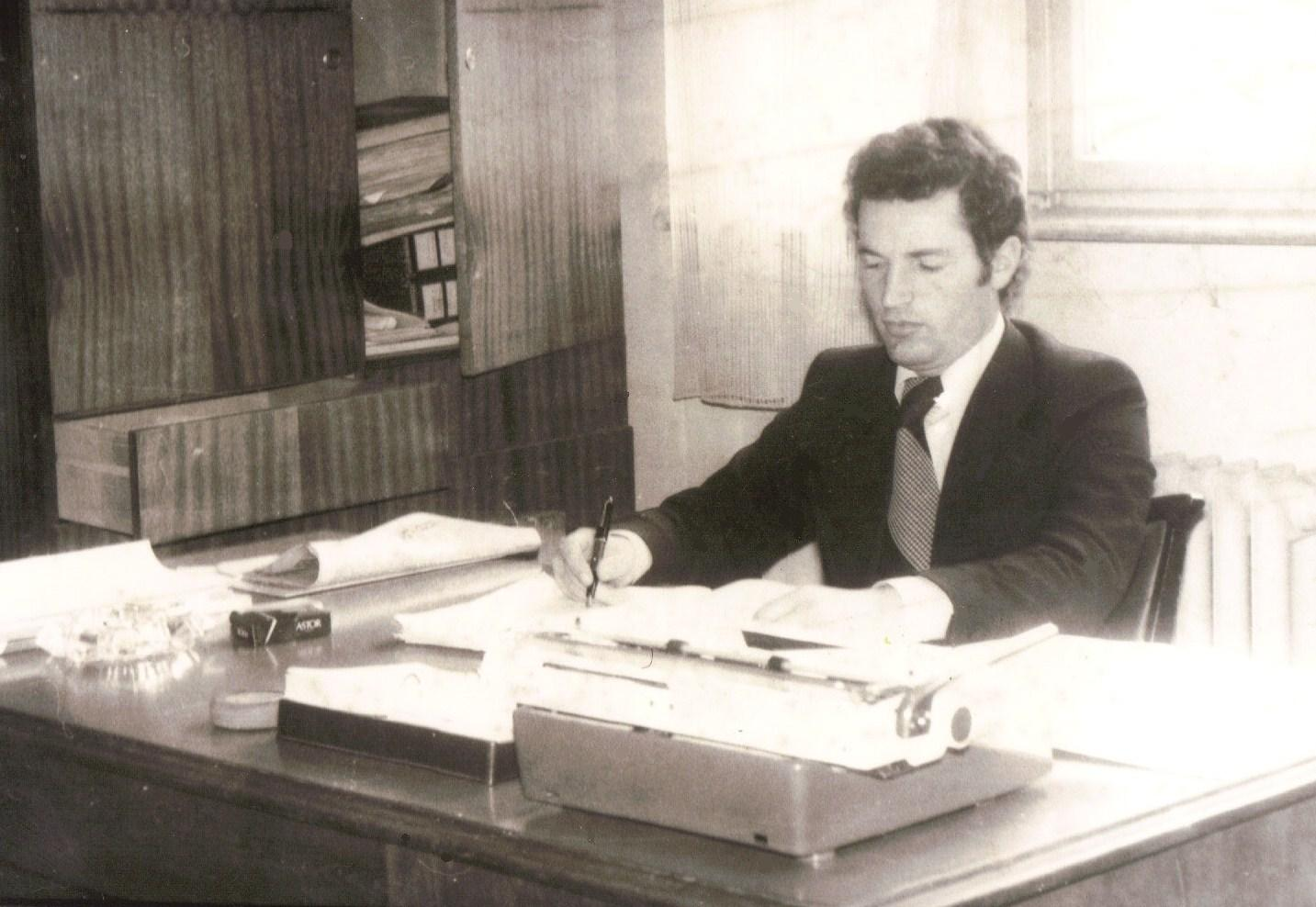
- Born: 11 July 1946; Mitrovica, FPR Yugoslavia
- Died: 16 January 2004 (aged 57); Brussels, Belgium
- Burial place: Martyr Cemetery, Pristina
- Movement: People's Movement of Kosovo (1982–1999)
- Opponents: SFR Yugoslavia (1968–1992); Serbia and Montenegro (1992–2004)

Musa Hoti was a Kosovan teacher and activist for the independence of Kosovo.

In 1968, he organized demonstrations in various Albanian-speaking cities in Kosovo, Montenegro and Macedonia; his activism led the Yugoslav government to consider him a dangerous opponent.

After emigrating to Brussels, he joined the National Movement for the Liberation of Kosovo, of which he was one of the leaders. In 1981, he shot to death Stojan Djerić and wounded Redzo Zuko, two Yugoslav consular agents, in self-defence. After several failed attempts by the Serbian secret services, he was assassinated on January 16, 2004.
