= UNMIK Travel Document =

Former passport

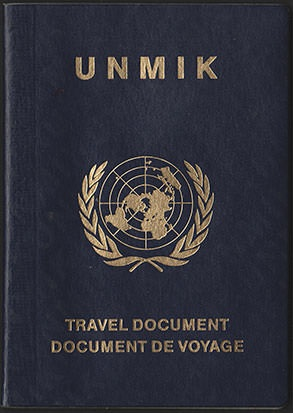
- Type: Travel document
- Issued by: UNMIK
- First issued: 2000
- Purpose: Travel abroad
- Valid in: 40 countries
- Eligibility: Kosovo residency
- Expiration: 2 years after acquisition for adults

An UNMIK Travel Document was a passport-sized travel document issued to residents of United Nations Administered Kosovo, who were not able to obtain a passport from the Federal Republic of Yugoslavia, for the purpose of foreign travel. The document was issued by the United Nations Interim Administration Mission in Kosovo (UNMIK) from 2000 to 2008.

== History ==
The UNMIK Travel Document was introduced in March 2000. After the government of Kosovo started to issue their own passports, UNMIK ceased issuing them. Existing documents retained their validity until expiry with the last ones expiring in 2010.

== Travel document ==
The travel document was not a passport as it did not contain information on nationality and as it was not issued by a sovereign state. The document carried UNMIK travel document/titre de voyage on the cover, contained 32 pages and was valid for two years. The document contained a machine readable strip. As the issuing authority was the UNMIK, the document had the official three-letter code "UNK" where normally the country code is placed.

== Acceptance ==
As the status of Kosovo was and remains controversial, the document was not widely accepted. For those countries that did accept it, its non-passport status sometimes restricted its applications. For example, although the United States did accept the UNMIK Travel Document, it did not place visa stickers in the document itself, but on a detached sheet.

In 2004, the UNMIK travel document was accepted by: Albania, Armenia, Austria, Belgium, Bosnia and Herzegovina, Bulgaria, Croatia, Cyprus, Cyprus, the Czech Republic, Denmark, Estonia, Finland, France, Germany, Greece, Hungary, Iceland, Ireland, Italy, Jordan, Latvia, Lithuania, Luxembourg, the Netherlands, Macedonia, Malaysia, Norway, Poland, Portugal, Romania, Slovakia, Slovenia, Spain, Sweden, Switzerland, Turkey, the United Kingdom, the United States, and Uzbekistan.
