= Machine-readable passport =

Machine-readable travel document utilizing optical character recognition

A machine-readable passport (MRP) is a machine-readable travel document (MRTD) with the data on the identity page encoded in optical character recognition format. Many countries began to issue machine-readable travel documents in the 1980s. Most travel passports worldwide are MRPs. The International Civil Aviation Organization (ICAO) required all ICAO member states to issue only MRPs as of April 1, 2010, with all non-MRP passports expiring by November 24, 2015.

Machine-readable passports are standardized by the ICAO Document 9303 (endorsed by the International Organization for Standardization and the International Electrotechnical Commission as ISO/IEC 7501-1) and have a special machine-readable zone (MRZ), which is usually at the bottom of the identity page at the beginning of a passport. The ICAO 9303 describes three types of documents corresponding to the ISO/IEC 7810 sizes:

- "Type 3" is typical of passport booklets. The MRZ consists of 2 lines × 44 characters.
- "Type 2" is relatively rare with 2 lines × 36 characters.
- "Type 1" is of a credit card-size with 3 lines × 30 characters.

The fixed format allows specification of document type, name, document number, nationality, date of birth, sex, and document expiration date. All these fields are required on a passport. There is room for optional, often country-dependent, supplementary information. There are also two sizes of machine-readable visas similarly defined.

Computers with a camera and suitable software can directly read the information on machine-readable passports. This enables faster processing of arriving passengers by immigration officials, and greater accuracy than manually-read passports, as well as faster data entry, more data to be read and better data matching against immigration databases and watchlists.

Apart from optically readable information, many passports contain an RFID chip which enables computers to read a higher amount of information, for example a photo of the bearer. These passports are called biometric passports and are also described by ICAO 9303.

== Format ==
=== Passport booklets ===
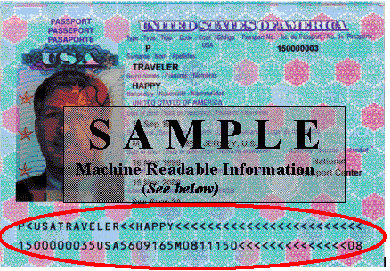
Page of a passport with machine-readable zone in the red oval (US passport pictured)

Passport booklets have an identity page containing the identity data. This page is in the ID-3 size of 125 × 88 mm (4.92 × 3.46 in).

The data of the machine-readable zone consists of two rows of 44 characters each. The only characters used are the Latin letters A–Z, the Arabic numerals 0–9, and the filler character <.

First row
Positions	Length	Characters	Meaning
1	1	alpha	P, indicating a passport
2	1	alpha+<	Type (for countries that distinguish between different types of passports)
3–5	3	alpha	Issuing country or organization (ISO 3166-1 alpha-3 code with modifications)
6–44	39	alpha+<	Surname, followed by two filler characters, followed by given names. Given names are separated by single filler characters. Some countries do not differentiate between surname and given name (i.e. no two filler characters), such as the Malaysian Passport

In the name field, spaces, hyphens and other punctuation are represented by <, except apostrophes, which are skipped. If the names are too long, names are abbreviated to their most significant parts. In that case, the last position must contain an alphabetic character to indicate possible truncation, and if there is a given name, the two fillers and at least one character of it must be included.

Second row
Positions	Length	Characters	Meaning
1–9	9	alpha+num+<	Passport number
10	1	numeric	Check digit over digits 1–9
11–13	3	alpha+<	Nationality or Citizenship (ISO 3166-1 alpha-3 code with modifications)
14–19	6	numeric	Date of birth (YYMMDD)
20	1	numeric	Check digit over digits 14–19
21	1	alpha+<	Sex (M, F or < for male, female or unspecified)
22–27	6	numeric	Expiration date of passport (YYMMDD)
28	1	numeric	Check digit over digits 22–27
29–42	14	alpha+num+<	Personal number (may be used by the issuing country as it desires)
43	1	numeric+<	Check digit over digits 29–42 (may be < or 0 if all characters are <)
44	1	numeric	Check digit over digits 1–10, 14–20, and 22–43

=== Official travel documents ===
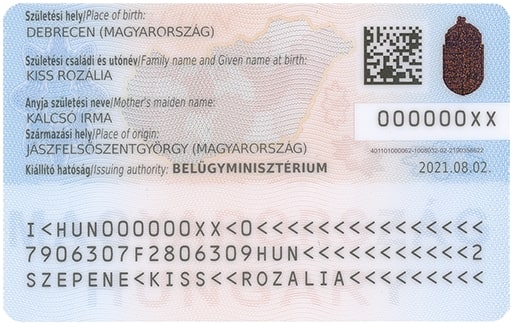
Hungarian identity card (2016)

Smaller documents such as identity and passport cards are usually in the ID-1 size, which is 85.6 × 54.0 mm (3.37 × 2.13 in), the same size as credit cards. The data of the machine-readable zone in a TD1 size card consists of three rows of 30 characters each. The only characters used are A–Z, 0–9 and the filler character <.

Some official travel documents are in the larger ID-2 size, 105.0 × 74.0 (4.13 × 2.91 in). They have a layout of the MRZ with two rows of 36 characters each, similar to the TD3 format, but with 31 characters for the name, 7 for the personal number and one less check digit. Yet some official travel documents are in the booklet format with a TD3 identity page.

The format of the first row for ID-1 (credit card size) documents is:

Positions	Length	Chars	Meaning
1	1	alpha	I, A or C
2	1	alpha+num+<	Type, This is at the discretion of the issuing state or authority, but 1–2 should be AC for Crew Member Certificates and V is not allowed as 2nd character. ID or I< are typically used for nationally issued ID cards and IP for passport cards.
3–5	3	alpha+<	Issuing country or organization (ISO 3166-1 alpha-3 code with modifications)
6–14	9	alpha+num+<	Document number
15	1	num+<	Check digit over digits 6–14
16–30	15	alpha+num+<	Optional

The format of the second row is:

Positions	Length	Chars	Meaning
1–6	6	num	Date of birth (YYMMDD)
7	1	num	Check digit over digits 1–6
8	1	alpha+<	Sex (M, F or < for male, female or unspecified)
9-14	6	num	Expiration date of document (YYMMDD)
15	1	num	Check digit over digits 9–14
16–18	3	alpha+<	Nationality
19–29	11	alpha+num+<	Optional^{1}
30	1	num	Check digit over digits 6–30 (upper line), 1–7, 9–15, 19–29 (middle line)

1: United States Passport Cards, as of 2011, use this field for the application number that produced the card.

The format of the third row is:

Positions	Length	Chars	Meaning
1–30	30	alpha+<	Surname, followed by two filler characters, followed by given names

The format of the first row for ID-2 (medium size) documents is:

Positions	Length	Chars	Meaning
1	1	alpha	I, P, A or C
2	1	alpha+<	Type, This is at the discretion of the issuing state or authority, but 1–2 should be AC for Crew Member Certificates and V is not allowed as 2nd character. ID or I< are typically used for nationally issued ID cards and IP for passport cards.
3–5	3	alpha+<	Issuing country or organization (ISO 3166-1 alpha-3 code with modifications)
6–36	30	alpha+<	Name and surname. If there is more than one name they are separated by single filler. Double filler indicates the end of the primary identifier.

The format of the second row is:

Positions	Length	Chars	Meaning
1–9	9	num	Document, ID number
10	1	num	Check digit over document number
11-13	3	alpha+<	Nationality
14-19	6	num	Birthday (YYMMDD)
20	1	num	Check digit for birthday
21	1	alpha	Sex: M, F, or X, for male, female, or unspecified
22-27	6	num	Expiration date (YYMMDD)
28	1	num	Check digit for expiration
29-35	7	alpha+num+<	Optional data
35	1	num	Check digit over optional data (not specified in ICAO 9303-6, may be used by issuing country regardless)
36	1	num	Check digit over digits 1–10, 14–20, and 22–35

=== Machine-readable visas ===
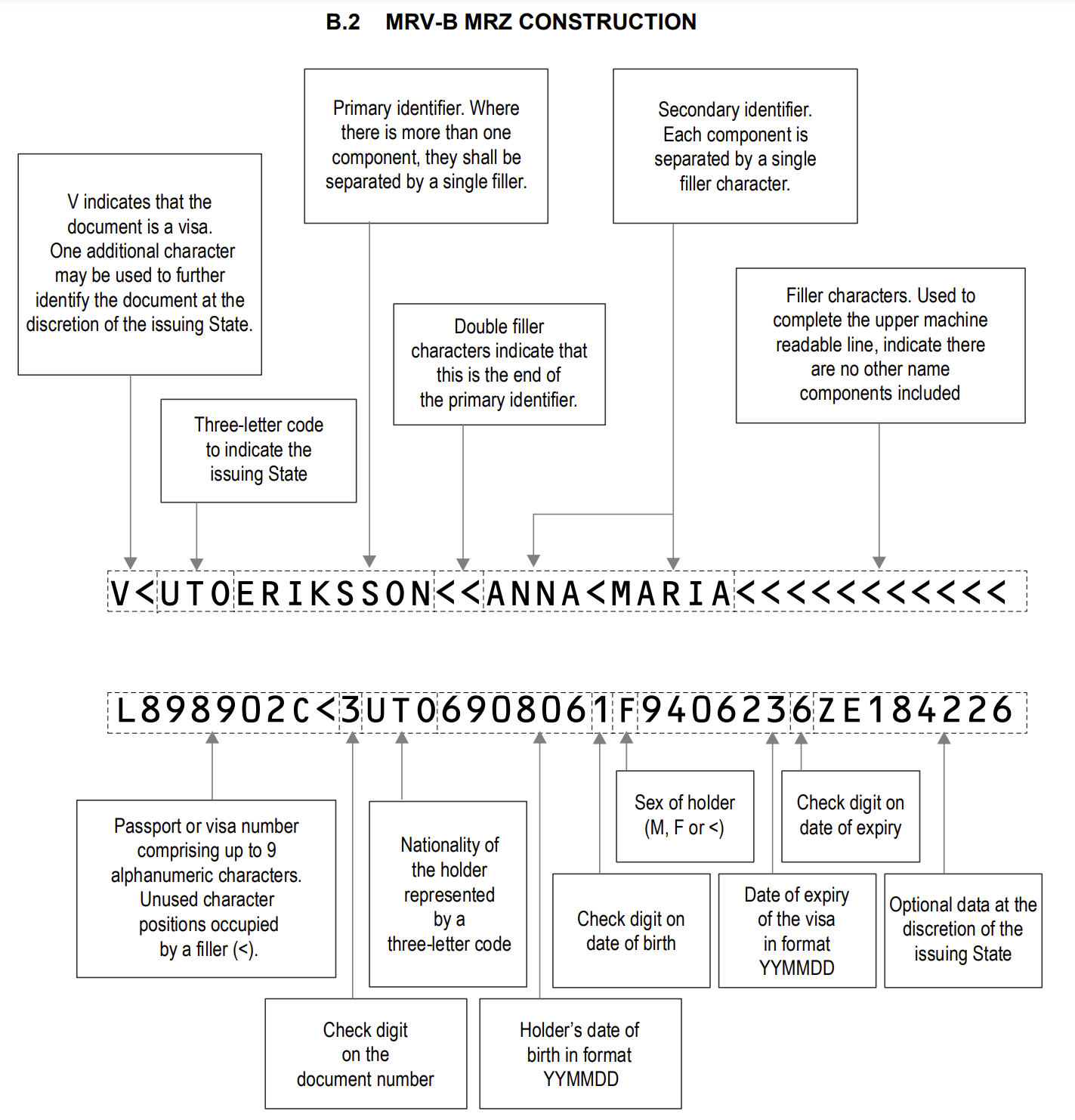
MRV-B Visa MRZ Construction

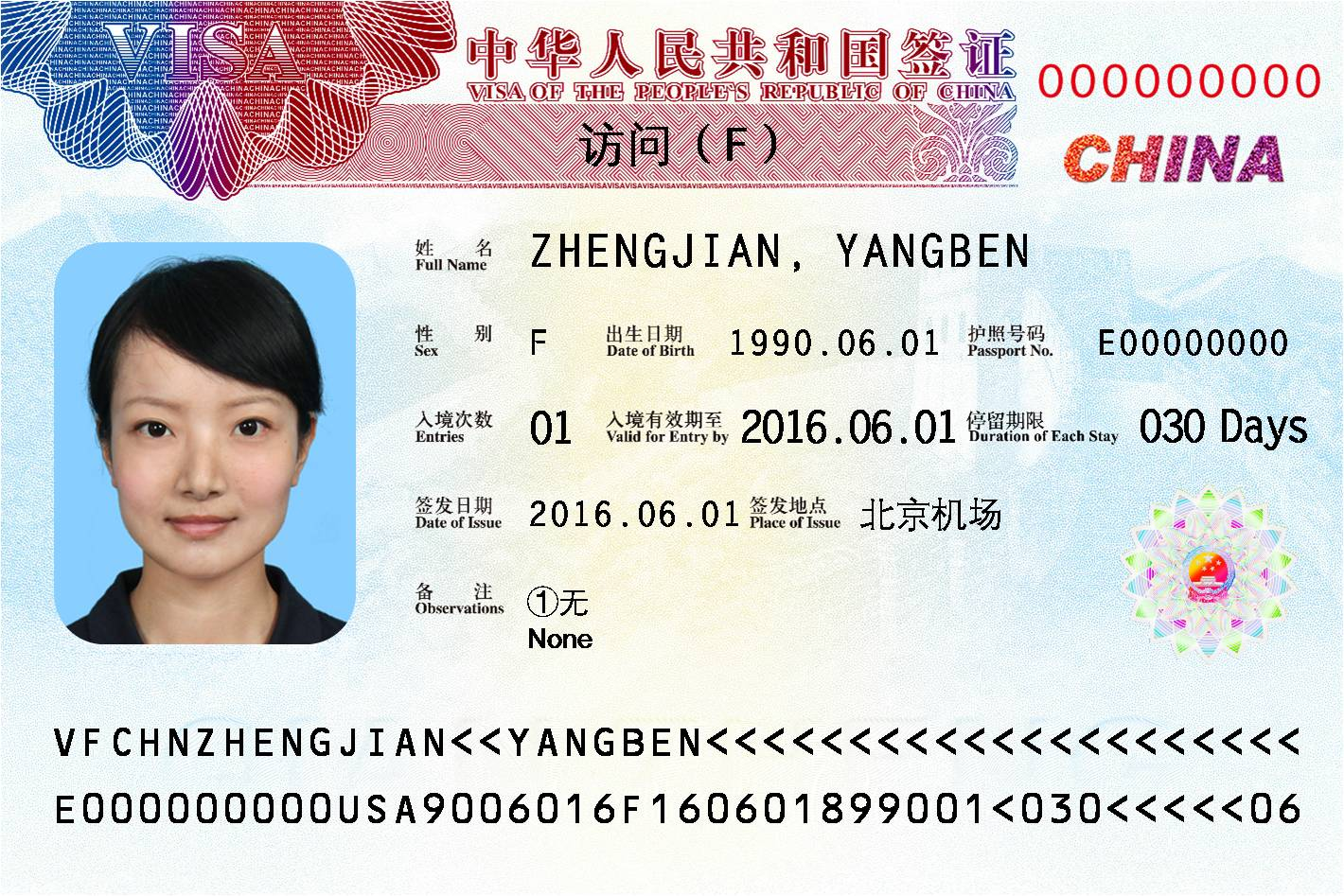
Chinese visa (2019)

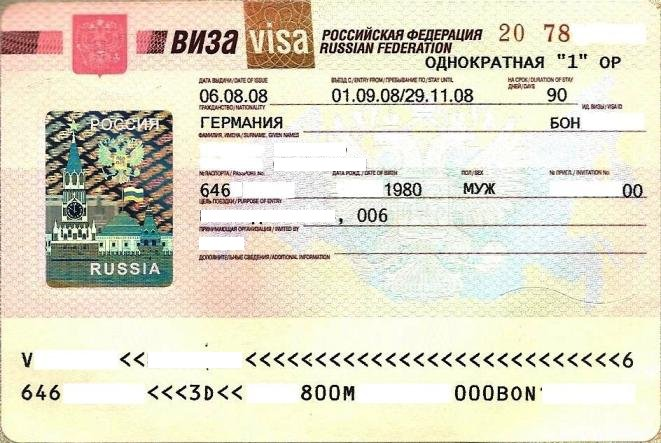
Russian visa

The ICAO Document 9303 part 7 describes machine-readable visas. They come in two different formats:

- MRV-A - 80 mm × 120 mm (3.15 in × 4.72 in), 2 × 44 chars
- MRV-B - 74 mm × 105 mm (2.91 in × 4.13 in), 2 × 36 chars

The format of the first row of the machine-readable zone is:

Positions	Length	Chars	Meaning
1	1	alpha	"V"
2	1	alpha+<	Type, this is at the discretion of the issuing state or authority
3–5	3	alpha+<	Issuing country or organization (ISO 3166-1 alpha-3 code with modifications)
6–44	39	alpha+<	Name in MRV-A
6–36	31	alpha+<	Name in MRV-B

The format of the second row is:

Positions	Length	Chars	Meaning
1-9	9	alpha+num+<	Passport or Visa number
10	1	num	Check digit
11–13	3	alpha+<	Nationality
14–19	6	num	Date of birth (YYMMDD)
20	1	num	Check digit
21	1	alpha+<	Sex
22-27	6	num	Valid until (YYMMDD)
28	1	num	Check digit
29–44	16	alpha+num+<	Optional data in MRV-A
29–36	8	alpha+num+<	Optional data in MRV-B

== Specifications common to all formats ==
The ICAO document 9303 part 3 describes specifications common to all Machine Readable Travel Documents.

The dimensions of the effective reading zone (ERZ) is standardized at 17.0 mm (0.67 in) in height with a margin of 3 mm at the document edges and 3.2 mm at the edge against the visual readable part. This is in order to allow use of a single machine reader.

=== Nationality / Citizenship codes ===
The nationality codes shall contain the ISO 3166-1 alpha-3 code with modifications for all formats. The check digit calculation method is also the same for all formats.

Some values that are different from ISO 3166-1 alpha-3 are used for the issuing country and nationality field:

- BAH: Bahamas (erroneously used in some early Bahamian passports; corrected to BHS)
- D: Germany
- EUE: European Union
- GBD: British Overseas Territories Citizen (BOTC) (note: the country code of the overseas territory is used to indicate issuing authority and nationality of BOTC), formerly British Dependent Territories Citizen (BDTC)
- GBN: British National (Overseas)
- GBO: British Overseas Citizen
- GBP: British Protected Person
- GBS: British Subject
- RKS: Kosovo
- UNA: specialized agency of the United Nations
- UNK: Resident of Kosovo to whom a travel document has been issued by the United Nations Interim Administration Mission in Kosovo (UNMIK)
- UNO: United Nations organization
- XBA: African Development Bank
- XIM: African Export–Import Bank
- XCC: Caribbean Community or one of its emissaries
- XCO: Common Market for Eastern and Southern Africa
- XEC: Economic Community of West African States
- XPO: International Criminal Police Organization
- XOM: Sovereign Military Order of Malta
- XXA: Stateless person, as per the 1954 Convention Relating to the Status of Stateless Persons
- XXB: Refugee, as per the 1951 Convention Relating to the Status of Refugees
- XXC: Refugee, other than defined above
- XXX: Unspecified nationality
- ZIM: Zimbabwe (erroneously used in some early Zimbabwean passports; corrected to ZWE)

Other values, which do not have broad acceptance internationally, include:

- NSK: Neue Slowenische Kunst passport (basically not accepted at all as passport)
- RKS: Kosovo
- WSA: World Service Authority World Passport (basically not accepted at all as passport)
- XCT: Turkish Republic of Northern Cyprus

==== Implementation challenges ====
Uruguay currently issues passports with the country of birth code in the place of the citizenship code, affecting naturalised citizens as their passports return "error", causing significant travel challenges for passport holders. This is due to a combination of the official Spanish translation of 9303 using "nacionalidad" rather than "ciudadania" to reflect the English original of citizenship - notable in part 3 section 7.1 which specifically addresses this potential error. In October 2023, the high level technical team of TAG/TRIPS4 addressed the Uruguay case and it is proposed the translation is adjusted and the update is communicated to Uruguayan authorities. Uruguayan authorities have committed to reviewing their policy on the understanding citizenship should be used, which overcomes the challenge of domestic definitions of nationality currently differing from citizenship.

=== Checksum calculation ===
The check digit calculation is as follows: each position is assigned a value; for the digits 0 to 9 this is the value of the digits, for the letters A to Z this is 10 to 35, for the filler < this is 0. The value of each position is then multiplied by its weight; the weight of the first position is 7, of the second it is 3, and of the third it is 1, and after that the weights repeat 7, 3, 1, and so on. All values are added together and the remainder of the final value divided by 10 is the check digit.

=== Names ===
Due to technical limits, characters inside the Machine Readable Zone (MRZ) need to be restricted to the 10 Arabic numerals, the 26 capital Latin letters A through Z, and the filler character <.

Apostrophes and similar punctuation marks have to be omitted, but hyphens and spaces should be replaced by an opening angle bracket.

Section 6 of the 9303 part 3 document specifies transliteration of letters outside the A–Z range. It recommends that diacritical marks on Latin letters A-Z are simply omitted (ç → C, ď → D, ê → E, ñ → N etc.), but it allows the following transliterations:

- å → AA
- ä → AE
- ð → DH
- ij (Dutch letter; capital form: IJ, the J as part of the ligature being capitalized, too)→ IJ
- ö → OE
- ü → UE or UXX
- ñ → NXX (allowed but Spanish uses U and N for ü and ñ)

The following transliterations are mandatory:

- æ → AE
- œ → OE
- ß → SS
- þ → TH

In Germany, Austria, Switzerland and Scandinavia it is standard to use the Å→AA, Ä or Æ→AE, Ö or Ø→OE, Ü→UE, and ß→SS mappings, so Müller becomes MUELLER, Gößmann becomes GOESSMANN, and Hämäläinen becomes HAEMAELAEINEN. ð, ñ and ü occur in Iceland and Spain, but they write them as D, N and U.

Austrian passports may (but do not always) contain a trilingual (in German, English, and French) explanation of the German umlauts and ß.

Russian visas and Russian internal passports have a one-to-one correspondence for the Cyrillic letters in the name and the Latin letters in the machine-readable zone, but since the Russian alphabet has 33 Cyrillic letters, 26 Latin letters are not sufficient, thus Russia also uses some Arabic numerals for the Cyrillic letters. This system excludes the Arabic numerals 0, 1, and 5 to avoid confusion with the Latin letters O, I, and S. This system is not used for Russian international passports which follow the international standard in which the MRZ is based on the transliteration into Latin letters.

Cyrillic letter	Corresponding Latin letter (or Arabic numeral)	Cyrillic letter	Corresponding Latin letter (or Arabic numeral)	Cyrillic letter	Corresponding Latin letter (or Arabic numeral)
Аа	A	Кк	K	Хх	H
Бб	B	Лл	L	Цц	C
Вв	V	Мм	M	Чч	3
Гг	G	Нн	N	Шш	4
Дд	D	Оо	O	Щщ	W
Ее	E	Пп	P	Ъъ	X
Ёё	2	Рр	R	Ыы	Y
Жж	J	Сс	S	Ьь	9
Зз	Z	Тт	T	Ээ	6
Ии	I	Уу	U	Юю	7
Йй	Q	Фф	F	Яя	8

=== First and given names ===
For airline tickets, visas and more, the advice is to only use the first name written in the passport. This is a problem for people who use their second name (as defined by the order in the passport) as their main name in daily speech. It is common, for example in Scandinavia, that the second or even third name is the one defined for daily usage: for example, the actor Hugh Laurie, whose full name is James Hugh Calum Laurie. Swedish travel agents usually book people using the first and daily name if the first one is not their main name, despite advice to use only the first name. If this is too long, the spelling in the MRZ could be used.

For people using a variant of their first name in daily speech, for example the former US president Bill Clinton whose full name is William Jefferson Clinton, the advice is to spell their name as in the passport.

In Scandinavian legislation, a middle name is a name placed between the given name and surname, and is usually a family name. Such names are written as an extra surname in passports. People have been stranded at airports since they entered this extra family name in the "middle name" field in airline booking forms, which in English speaking tradition is a given name.

Chinese, Japanese, Korean and Hungarian names might pose a challenge too, since the family name is normally written first. Tickets should use given name and surname as indicated in passports. Indonesian and Burmese mononyms also create a challenge in passport issuances, since many of them have no surname.

This name issue is also an issue for post-Brexit EU women under the Brexit settled status (they have two family names, a birth and marriage name, but only the birth name was used by the passport MRZ and therefore used in the settlement application, although they have been using the married name in UK population register).

== See also ==
- Basic access control
- Card standards
- ISO/IEC 14443 (Proximity card standard)
- List of national identity card policies by country
- Identity document
- Identity Cards Act 2006 of the United Kingdom
- Universal electronic card
