= Pavlina Hoti =

Albanian politician

Member of the Albanian parliament
- In office 2009–2013

Personal details
- Political party: Democratic Party

Pavlina Hoti was a member of the Assembly of the Republic of Albania for the Democratic Party of Albania.

== See also ==
- Politics of Albania
