= Identity card of Kosovo =

National identity card of Kosovo

Identity card of Kosovo: Letërnjoftim; Лична Карта
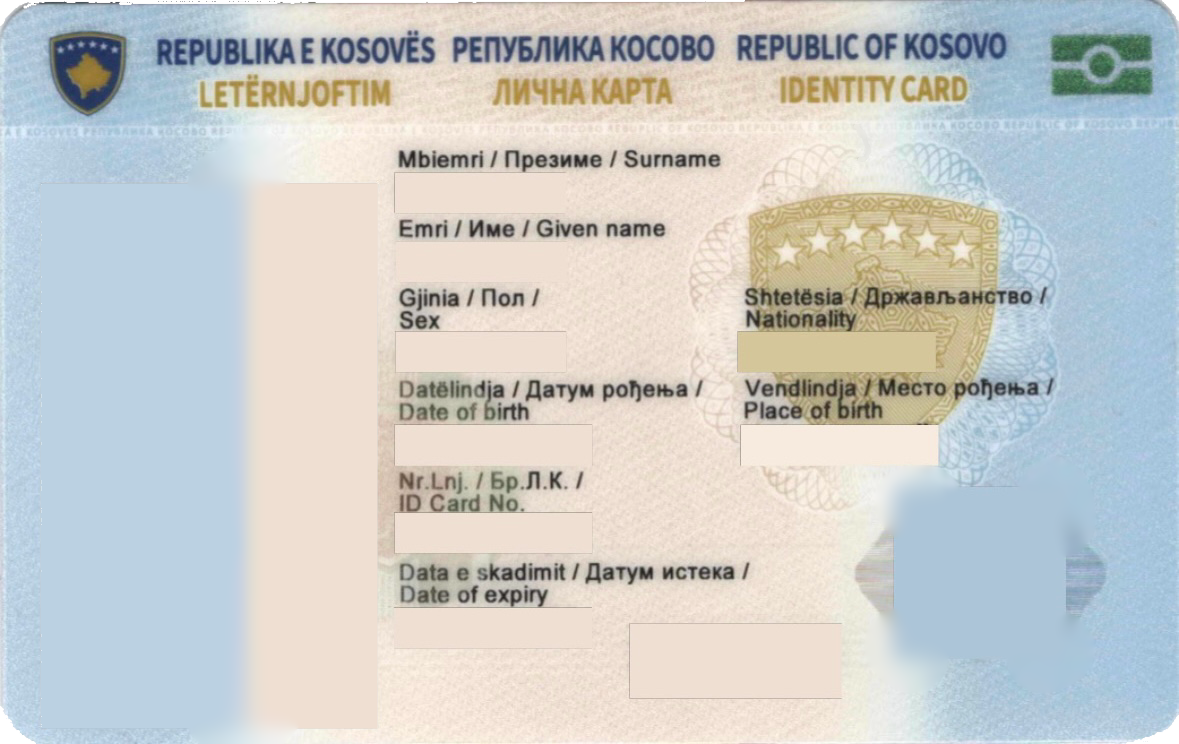
- The front cover of an identity card of Kosovo

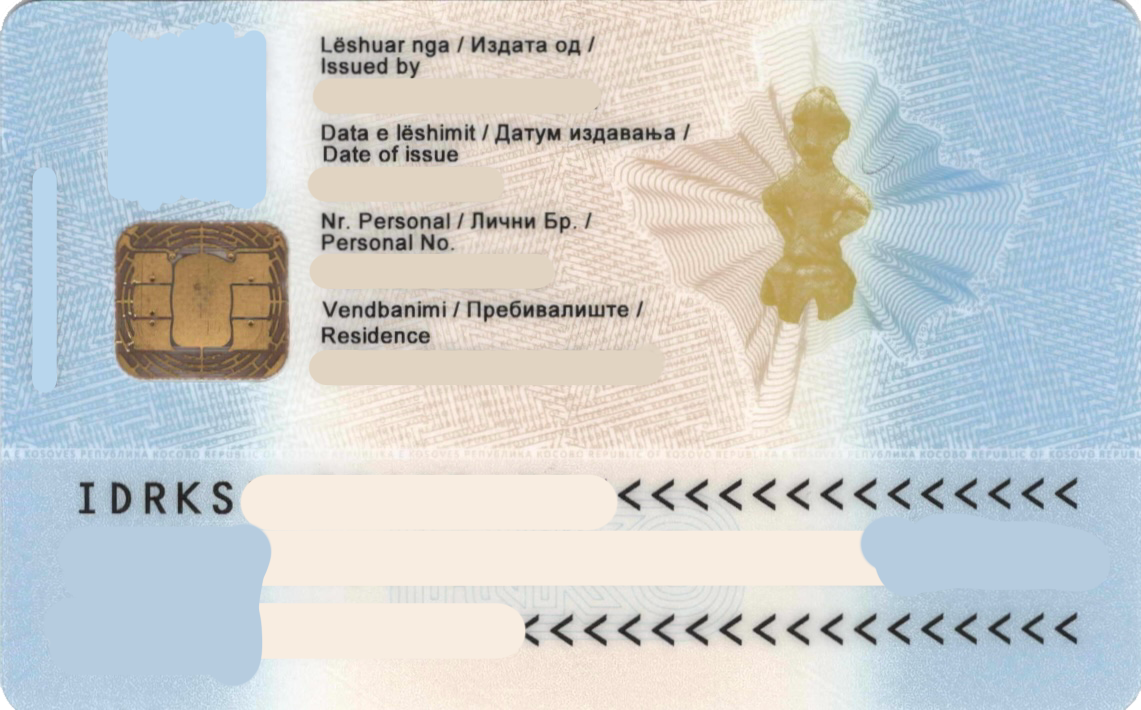
- The back cover of an identity card of Kosovo
- Type: Identity card, optional replacement for passport in the listed countries
- Issued by: Kosovo
- Valid in: Kosovo Albania North Macedonia; Montenegro Serbia
- Eligibility: 16 years of age and Kosovar Citizenship

The Identity card of Kosovo (Albanian: Letërnjoftim; Serbian: Лична Карта, romanized: Lična Karta) is an ID card issued to the citizens of Kosovo for the purpose of establishing their identity, as well as serving as proof of residency, right to work and right to public benefits. A biometric ID card has been issued since 2013.

== Design ==
Obverse side of the 2008 Kosovo non-biometric ID card

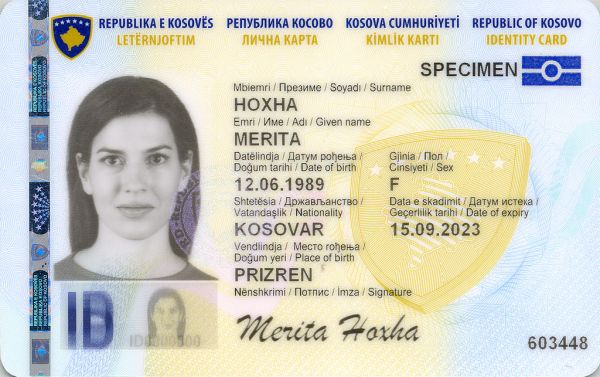
Obverse side of the 2013 Kosovo biometric ID card

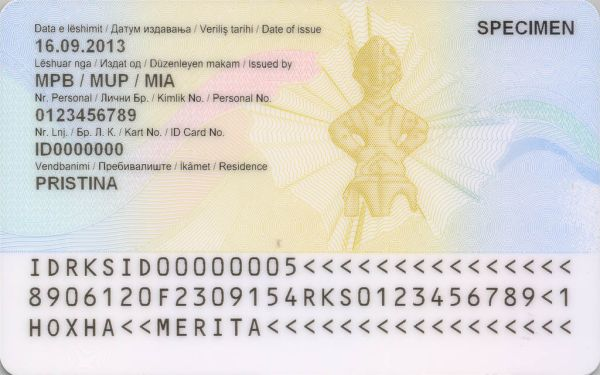
Reverse side of the 2013 Kosovo biometric ID card

== International travel ==
An identity card of Kosovo can be used instead of a passport for travel to some countries neighbouring Kosovo:

Countries (and territories)	Agreement / Stay
Albania	Freedom of Movement
North Macedonia	90 days
Montenegro	30 days
Serbia	60 days

== See also ==
- Kosovan passport
