= Muhammad Khan Hoti =

Pakistani politician

Member of the National Assembly of Pakistan
- In office 2008 – January 2012

Personal details
- Party: PMLN (2012-present)

Khawaja Muhammad Khan Hoti is a Pakistani politician who served as member of the National Assembly of Pakistan from 2008 to 2012.

== Political career ==
Hoti has been provincial minister of Khyber Pakhtunkhwa for tourism in 1989, and provincial minister of Khyber Pakhtunkhwa for education from 1993 to 1996.

In 2006, he quit Pakistan Peoples Party to join Awami National Party (ANP).

He was elected to the National Assembly of Pakistan from Constituency NA-9 (Mardan-I) as a candidate of ANP in the 2008 Pakistani general election.

In December 2011, he quit ANP to join Pakistan Tehreek-e-Insaf (PTI). In January 2012, he resigned from his National Assembly seat. In December 2012, he quit PTI and joined Pakistan Muslim League (N).
