= Kosovars =

Citizens and nationals of Kosovo

Total population
- 1,585,566 (in Kosovo)

Regions with significant populations
- Kosovo, Germany, Switzerland, Italy, Slovenia, United Kingdom, United States

Languages
- Albanian (majority), Serbian, Bosniak, Turkish, Romani, Gora dialect, Croatian

Religion
- Islam (Sunni and Bektashi), Serbian Orthodox, Roman Catholic

Kosovars or Kosovans are the citizens of Kosovo. As a civic nationality, the designation encompasses all individuals who hold citizenship regardless of ethnic origin. Ethnic Albanians form the overwhelming majority of the population (approximately 92%), alongside constitutionally recognized minority communities including Serbs, Bosniaks, and others. Kosovar citizenship can be acquired through birth, naturalization, or other legal processes.

== Ethnic groups ==
According to demographic sources, Kosovo has a population of around two million. Ethnic Albanians form the majority in Kosovo with 92.9% of the population being Albanian, making Kosovo one of Europe's most homogenous countries. The vast majority of Kosovo Albanians are Muslim, with a Catholic minority and speak the Albanian language. Other ethnic groups in Kosovo include Serbs, Romani people, Ashkali and Balkan Egyptians, Bosniaks, Turks and Gorani people.

== Nationality law ==
Kosovo provides citizenship to a person in the following circumstances:

- Being born to two Kosovar parents, or in some cases to one Kosovar parent
- Being born in Kosovo to stateless or unknown parents, or if they would otherwise be stateless
- Being adopted by Kosovar parents
- Naturalization after having lived in the country for at least 5 years, having married a Kosovar spouse, being a minor child of a person being naturalized, or being from the Kosovar diaspora

The country permits dual citizenship.

== See also ==
- Demographics of Kosovo
