= Boulevard (disambiguation) =

A boulevard is a type of road, typically a wider more formal road.

Boulevard may also refer to:

== Films ==
- Boulevard (1960 film), a French drama
- Boulevard (1994 film), an American thriller
- Boulevard (2014 film), an American drama directed by Dito Montiel
- Boulevard (2026 film), a Spanish romantic drama

== Magazines ==
- Boulevard (New York-based magazine), about the Gold Coast area of Long Island, NY, formerly The Boulevard, founded 1985
- Boulevard (magazine), an American literary magazine, founded 1985
- Le Boulevard (Paris), French magazine, 1861-1863

== Music ==
- Boulevard (Murray McLauchlan album), 1976
- Boulevard (St. Germain album), 1995
- "Boulevard" (song), single from Jackson Browne's 1980 album, Hold Out
- Boulevard (Canadian band), Canadian rock band, 1980s – early '90s, 2014 – present
- Boulevard (Finnish band), a Finnish rock band founded in 1983

== Transport ==
- Boulevard of the Allies in Pittsburgh, commonly referred to as "The Boulevard "
- Roosevelt Boulevard (Philadelphia), commonly referred to as "The Boulevard "
- Road verge, one of a number of terms for a vegetative strip beside the carriageway of a road
- Boulevard (Atlanta), a boulevard named "Boulevard"
- Arthur Ashe Boulevard, a historic street in Richmond, Virginia also referred to as "the Boulevard"
- Bulevardi (English: Boulevard), a boulevard in Helsinki

== Other uses ==
- Boulevard Shopping Centre (French: Le Boulevard), a shopping centre in Montreal
- The Boulevard (Amman), a pedestrian shopping street in Amman, Jordan
- Boulevard, California, unincorporated community in the United States
- El Cajon Boulevard, major thoroughfare through San Diego, La Mesa and El Cajon, California and called "The Boulevard"
- Boulevard (restaurant), restaurant located in San Francisco, California
- The Boulevard (stadium), in Hull, England from 1895 to 2010
- Boulevard Brewing Company, in Kansas City, Missouri

== See also ==
- BLVD (disambiguation)
- BD (disambiguation)
