= BLVD =

BLVD may refer to:

- Boulevard, a type of street
- Boulevard (Canadian band), formerly named BLVD
- BLVD Place, a property in Houston, Texas, United States
- Blvd (Las Vegas), an upcoming shopping center on the Las Vegas Strip

== See also ==
- BD (disambiguation)
- Boulevard (disambiguation)
