= List of country codes: A–K =

"Other" sections may contain three-letter-codes of sports organizations if they are different from both ISO and IOC Codes.

== A ==
=== Afghanistan ===
ISO 3166-1 numeric 004	ISO 3166-1 alpha-3 AFG	ISO 3166-1 alpha-2 AF	ICAO airport code prefix OA
E.164 code 93	IOC country code AFG	Country code top-level domain.af	ICAO aircraft regis. prefix YA-
E.212 mobile country code 412	NATO three-letter code AFG	NATO two-letter code AF	LOC MARC code AF
ITU Maritime ID 401	ITU letter code AFG	FIPS country code AF	License plate code AFG
GS1 GTIN prefix —	UNDP country code AFG	WMO country code AF	ITU callsign prefixes T6A-T6Z, YAA-YAZ

=== Åland (region of Finland) ===
ISO 3166-1 numeric 248	ISO 3166-1 alpha-3 ALA	ISO 3166-1 alpha-2 AX	ICAO airport code prefix —
E.164 code 358	IOC country code —	Country code top-level domain.ax	ICAO aircraft regis. prefix OH-
E.212 mobile country code 244	NATO three-letter code —	NATO two-letter code FI-AL	LOC MARC code —
ITU Maritime ID —	ITU letter code —	FIPS country code —	License plate code AX (unofficial)
GS1 GTIN prefix —	UNDP country code —	WMO country code —	ITU callsign prefixes —

=== Albania ===
ISO 3166-1 numeric 008	ISO 3166-1 alpha-3 ALB	ISO 3166-1 alpha-2 AL	ICAO airport code prefix LA
E.164 code 355	IOC country code ALB	Country code top-level domain.al	ICAO aircraft regis. prefix ZA-
E.212 mobile country code 276	NATO three-letter code ALB	NATO two-letter code AL	LOC MARC code AA
ITU Maritime ID 201	ITU letter code ALB	FIPS country code AL	License plate code AL
GS1 GTIN prefix 530	UNDP country code ALB	WMO country code AB	ITU callsign prefixes ZAA-ZAZ

=== Alderney (part of Guernsey) ===
ISO 3166-1 numeric —	ISO 3166-1 alpha-3 —	ISO 3166-1 alpha-2 —	ICAO airport code prefix —
E.164 code 44	IOC country code —	Country code top-level domain —	ICAO aircraft regis. prefix —
E.212 mobile country code —	NATO three-letter code —	NATO two-letter code —	LOC MARC code —
ITU Maritime ID —	ITU letter code —	FIPS country code —	License plate code GBA
GS1 GTIN prefix —	UNDP country code —	WMO country code —	ITU callsign prefixes —

Other:

- IIGA: ALD

=== Algeria ===
ISO 3166-1 numeric 012	ISO 3166-1 alpha-3 DZA	ISO 3166-1 alpha-2 DZ	ICAO airport code prefix DA
E.164 code 213	IOC country code ALG	Country code top-level domain.dz	ICAO aircraft regis. prefix 7T-
E.212 mobile country code 603	NATO three-letter code DZA	NATO two-letter code AG	LOC MARC code AE
ITU Maritime ID 605	ITU letter code ALG	FIPS country code AG	License plate code DZ
GS1 GTIN prefix 316	UNDP country code ALG	WMO country code AL	ITU callsign prefixes 7RA-7RZ, 7TA-7YZ

=== American Samoa (territory of the US) ===
ISO 3166-1 numeric 016	ISO 3166-1 alpha-3 ASM	ISO 3166-1 alpha-2 AS	ICAO airport code prefix NS
E.164 code 1684	IOC country code ASA	Country code top-level domain.as	ICAO aircraft regis. prefix N-
E.212 mobile country code 544	NATO three-letter code ASM	NATO two-letter code SS	LOC MARC code AS
ITU Maritime ID 559	ITU letter code SMA	FIPS country code AQ	License plate code —
GS1 GTIN prefix —	UNDP country code AMS	WMO country code ZS	ITU callsign prefixes —

=== Andorra ===
ISO 3166-1 numeric 020	ISO 3166-1 alpha-3 AND	ISO 3166-1 alpha-2 AD	ICAO airport code prefix —
E.164 code 376	IOC country code AND	Country code top-level domain.ad	ICAO aircraft regis. prefix C3-
E.212 mobile country code 213	NATO three-letter code AND	NATO two-letter code AN	LOC MARC code AN
ITU Maritime ID 202	ITU letter code AND	FIPS country code AN	License plate code AND
GS1 GTIN prefix —	UNDP country code AND	WMO country code —	ITU callsign prefixes C3A-C3Z

=== Angola ===
ISO 3166-1 numeric 024	ISO 3166-1 alpha-3 AGO	ISO 3166-1 alpha-2 AO	ICAO airport code prefix FN
E.164 code 244	IOC country code ANG	Country code top-level domain.ao	ICAO aircraft regis. prefix D2-
E.212 mobile country code 631	NATO three-letter code AGO	NATO two-letter code AO	LOC MARC code AO
ITU Maritime ID 603	ITU letter code AGL	FIPS country code AO	License plate code ANG (unofficial)
GS1 GTIN prefix —	UNDP country code ANG	WMO country code AN	ITU callsign prefixes D2A-D3Z

=== Anguilla (British territory) ===
ISO 3166-1 numeric 660	ISO 3166-1 alpha-3 AIA	ISO 3166-1 alpha-2 AI	ICAO airport code prefix TQ
E.164 code 1	IOC country code —	Country code top-level domain.ai	ICAO aircraft regis. prefix VP-LA-
E.212 mobile country code 365	NATO three-letter code AIA	NATO two-letter code AV	LOC MARC code AM
ITU Maritime ID 301	ITU letter code AIA	FIPS country code AV	License plate code —
GS1 GTIN prefix —	UNDP country code ANL	WMO country code —	ITU callsign prefixes —

Other:

- World Aquatics: AGU

=== Antarctica ===
ISO 3166-1 numeric 010	ISO 3166-1 alpha-3 ATA	ISO 3166-1 alpha-2 AQ	ICAO airport code prefix NZ, SA, SC
E.164 code 672	IOC country code —	Country code top-level domain.aq	ICAO aircraft regis. prefix —
E.212 mobile country code —	NATO three-letter code ATA	NATO two-letter code AY	LOC MARC code AY
ITU Maritime ID —	ITU letter code ATA	FIPS country code AY	License plate code —
GS1 GTIN prefix —	UNDP country code —	WMO country code AA	ITU callsign prefixes —

=== Antigua and Barbuda ===
ISO 3166-1 numeric 028	ISO 3166-1 alpha-3 ATG	ISO 3166-1 alpha-2 AG	ICAO airport code prefix TA
E.164 code 1	IOC country code ANT	Country code top-level domain.ag	ICAO aircraft regis. prefix V2-
E.212 mobile country code 344	NATO three-letter code ATG	NATO two-letter code AC	LOC MARC code AQ
ITU Maritime ID 304	ITU letter code ATG	FIPS country code AC	License plate code —
GS1 GTIN prefix —	UNDP country code ANT	WMO country code AT	ITU callsign prefixes V2A-V2Z

=== Argentina ===
ISO 3166-1 numeric 032	ISO 3166-1 alpha-3 ARG	ISO 3166-1 alpha-2 AR	ICAO airport code prefix SA
E.164 code 54	IOC country code ARG	Country code top-level domain.ar	ICAO aircraft regis. prefix LQ-, LV-
E.212 mobile country code 722	NATO three-letter code ARG	NATO two-letter code AR	LOC MARC code AG
ITU Maritime ID 701	ITU letter code ARG	FIPS country code AR	License plate code RA
GS1 GTIN prefix 778-779	UNDP country code ARG	WMO country code AG	ITU callsign prefixes AYA-AZZ,L2A-L9Z,LOA-LWZ

=== Armenia ===
ISO 3166-1 numeric 051	ISO 3166-1 alpha-3 ARM	ISO 3166-1 alpha-2 AM	ICAO airport code prefix UD
E.164 code 374	IOC country code ARM	Country code top-level domain.am	ICAO aircraft regis. prefix EK-
E.212 mobile country code 283	NATO three-letter code ARM	NATO two-letter code AM	LOC MARC code AI
ITU Maritime ID 216	ITU letter code ARM	FIPS country code AM	License plate code AM
GS1 GTIN prefix 485	UNDP country code ARM	WMO country code AY	ITU callsign prefixes EKA-EKZ

=== Aruba (Kingdom of the Netherlands) ===
ISO 3166-1 numeric 533	ISO 3166-1 alpha-3 ABW	ISO 3166-1 alpha-2 AW	ICAO airport code prefix TN
E.164 code 297	IOC country code ARU	Country code top-level domain.aw	ICAO aircraft regis. prefix P4-
E.212 mobile country code 363	NATO three-letter code ABW	NATO two-letter code AA	LOC MARC code AW
ITU Maritime ID 307	ITU letter code ABW	FIPS country code AA	License plate code —
GS1 GTIN prefix —	UNDP country code ARU	WMO country code NU	ITU callsign prefixes P4A-P4Z

=== Australia ===
ISO 3166-1 numeric 036	ISO 3166-1 alpha-3 AUS	ISO 3166-1 alpha-2 AU	ICAO airport code prefix Y
E.164 code 61	IOC country code AUS	Country code top-level domain.au	ICAO aircraft regis. prefix VH-
E.212 mobile country code 505	NATO three-letter code AUS	NATO two-letter code AS	LOC MARC code AT
ITU Maritime ID 503	ITU letter code AUS	FIPS country code AS	License plate code AUS
GS1 GTIN prefix 930-939	UNDP country code AUL	WMO country code AU	ITU callsign prefixes AXA-AXZ,VHA-VNZ,VZA-VZZ

=== Austria ===
ISO 3166-1 numeric 040	ISO 3166-1 alpha-3 AUT	ISO 3166-1 alpha-2 AT	ICAO airport code prefix LO
E.164 code 43	IOC country code AUT	Country code top-level domain.at	ICAO aircraft regis. prefix OE-
E.212 mobile country code 232	NATO three-letter code AUT	NATO two-letter code AU	LOC MARC code AU
ITU Maritime ID 203	ITU letter code AUT	FIPS country code AU	License plate code A
GS1 GTIN prefix 900-919	UNDP country code AUS	WMO country code OS	ITU callsign prefixes OEA-OEZ

=== Azerbaijan ===
ISO 3166-1 numeric 031	ISO 3166-1 alpha-3 AZE	ISO 3166-1 alpha-2 AZ	ICAO airport code prefix UB
E.164 code 994	IOC country code AZE	Country code top-level domain.az	ICAO aircraft regis. prefix 4K-
E.212 mobile country code 400	NATO three-letter code AZE	NATO two-letter code AJ	LOC MARC code AJ
ITU Maritime ID 423	ITU letter code AZE	FIPS country code AJ	License plate code AZ
GS1 GTIN prefix 476	UNDP country code AZE	WMO country code AJ	ITU callsign prefixes 4JA-4KZ

== B ==
=== The Bahamas ===
ISO 3166-1 numeric 044	ISO 3166-1 alpha-3 BHS	ISO 3166-1 alpha-2 BS	ICAO airport code prefix MY
E.164 code 1	IOC country code BAH	Country code top-level domain.bs	ICAO aircraft regis. prefix C6-
E.212 mobile country code 364	NATO three-letter code BHS	NATO two-letter code BF	LOC MARC code BF
ITU Maritime ID 308, 309, 311	ITU letter code BAH	FIPS country code BF	License plate code BS
GS1 GTIN prefix —	UNDP country code BHA	WMO country code BA	ITU callsign prefixes C6A-C6Z

=== Bahrain ===
ISO 3166-1 numeric 048	ISO 3166-1 alpha-3 BHR	ISO 3166-1 alpha-2 BH	ICAO airport code prefix OB
E.164 code 973	IOC country code BRN	Country code top-level domain.bh	ICAO aircraft regis. prefix A9C-
E.212 mobile country code 426	NATO three-letter code BHR	NATO two-letter code BA	LOC MARC code BA
ITU Maritime ID 408	ITU letter code BHR	FIPS country code BA	License plate code BRN
GS1 GTIN prefix 608	UNDP country code BAH	WMO country code BN	ITU callsign prefixes A9A-A9Z

=== Bangladesh ===
ISO 3166-1 numeric 050	ISO 3166-1 alpha-3 BGD	ISO 3166-1 alpha-2 BD	ICAO airport code prefix VG
E.164 code 880	IOC country code BAN	Country code top-level domain.bd	ICAO aircraft regis. prefix S2-
E.212 mobile country code 470	NATO three-letter code BGD	NATO two-letter code BG	LOC MARC code BG
ITU Maritime ID 405	ITU letter code BGD	FIPS country code BG	License plate code BD
GS1 GTIN prefix —	UNDP country code BGD	WMO country code BW	ITU callsign prefixes S2A-S3Z

=== Barbados ===
ISO 3166-1 numeric 052	ISO 3166-1 alpha-3 BRB	ISO 3166-1 alpha-2 BB	ICAO airport code prefix TB
E.164 code 1	IOC country code BAR	Country code top-level domain.bb	ICAO aircraft regis. prefix 8P-
E.212 mobile country code 342	NATO three-letter code BRB	NATO two-letter code BB	LOC MARC code BB
ITU Maritime ID 314	ITU letter code BRB	FIPS country code BB	License plate code BDS
GS1 GTIN prefix —	UNDP country code BAR	WMO country code BR	ITU callsign prefixes 8PA-8PZ

=== Belarus ===
ISO 3166-1 numeric 112	ISO 3166-1 alpha-3 BLR	ISO 3166-1 alpha-2 BY	ICAO airport code prefix UM
E.164 code 375	IOC country code BLR	Country code top-level domain.by	ICAO aircraft regis. prefix EW-
E.212 mobile country code 257	NATO three-letter code BLR	NATO two-letter code BO	LOC MARC code BW
ITU Maritime ID 206	ITU letter code BLR	FIPS country code BO	License plate code BY
GS1 GTIN prefix 481	UNDP country code BYE	WMO country code BY	ITU callsign prefixes EUA-EWZ

=== Belgium ===
ISO 3166-1 numeric 056	ISO 3166-1 alpha-3 BEL	ISO 3166-1 alpha-2 BE	ICAO airport code prefix EB
E.164 code 32	IOC country code BEL	Country code top-level domain.be	ICAO aircraft regis. prefix OO-
E.212 mobile country code 206	NATO three-letter code BEL	NATO two-letter code BE	LOC MARC code BE
ITU Maritime ID 205	ITU letter code BEL	FIPS country code BE	License plate code B
GS1 GTIN prefix 540-549	UNDP country code BEL	WMO country code BX	ITU callsign prefixes ONA-OTZ

=== Belize ===
ISO 3166-1 numeric 084	ISO 3166-1 alpha-3 BLZ	ISO 3166-1 alpha-2 BZ	ICAO airport code prefix MZ
E.164 code 501	IOC country code BIZ	Country code top-level domain.bz	ICAO aircraft regis. prefix V3-
E.212 mobile country code 702	NATO three-letter code BLZ	NATO two-letter code BH	LOC MARC code BH
ITU Maritime ID 312	ITU letter code BLZ	FIPS country code BH	License plate code BH
GS1 GTIN prefix —	UNDP country code BZE	WMO country code BH	ITU callsign prefixes V3A-V3Z

=== Benin ===
ISO 3166-1 numeric 204	ISO 3166-1 alpha-3 BEN	ISO 3166-1 alpha-2 BJ	ICAO airport code prefix DB
E.164 code 229	IOC country code BEN	Country code top-level domain.bj	ICAO aircraft regis. prefix TY-
E.212 mobile country code 616	NATO three-letter code BEN	NATO two-letter code BN	LOC MARC code DM
ITU Maritime ID 610	ITU letter code BEN	FIPS country code BN	License plate code DY
GS1 GTIN prefix —	UNDP country code BEN	WMO country code BJ	ITU callsign prefixes TYA-TYZ

=== Bermuda (territory of the UK) ===
ISO 3166-1 numeric 060	ISO 3166-1 alpha-3 BMU	ISO 3166-1 alpha-2 BM	ICAO airport code prefix TX
E.164 code 1	IOC country code BER	Country code top-level domain.bm	ICAO aircraft regis. prefix VP-B-, VQ-B-
E.212 mobile country code 350	NATO three-letter code BMU	NATO two-letter code BD	LOC MARC code BM
ITU Maritime ID 310	ITU letter code BER	FIPS country code BD	License plate code —
GS1 GTIN prefix —	UNDP country code BER	WMO country code BE	ITU callsign prefixes —

=== Bhutan ===
ISO 3166-1 numeric 064	ISO 3166-1 alpha-3 BTN	ISO 3166-1 alpha-2 BT	ICAO airport code prefix VQ
E.164 code 975	IOC country code BHU	Country code top-level domain.bt	ICAO aircraft regis. prefix A5-
E.212 mobile country code 402	NATO three-letter code BTN	NATO two-letter code BT	LOC MARC code BT
ITU Maritime ID 410	ITU letter code BTN	FIPS country code BT	License plate code BHT (unofficial)
GS1 GTIN prefix —	UNDP country code BHU	WMO country code —	ITU callsign prefixes A5A-A5Z

=== Bolivia ===
ISO 3166-1 numeric 068	ISO 3166-1 alpha-3 BOL	ISO 3166-1 alpha-2 BO	ICAO airport code prefix SL
E.164 code 591	IOC country code BOL	Country code top-level domain.bo	ICAO aircraft regis. prefix CP-
E.212 mobile country code 736	NATO three-letter code BOL	NATO two-letter code BL	LOC MARC code BO
ITU Maritime ID 720	ITU letter code BOL	FIPS country code BL	License plate code BOL
GS1 GTIN prefix 777	UNDP country code BOL	WMO country code BO	ITU callsign prefixes CPA-CPZ

=== Bosnia and Herzegovina ===
ISO 3166-1 numeric 070	ISO 3166-1 alpha-3 BIH	ISO 3166-1 alpha-2 BA	ICAO airport code prefix LQ
E.164 code 387	IOC country code BIH	Country code top-level domain.ba	ICAO aircraft regis. prefix T9-
E.212 mobile country code 218	NATO three-letter code BIH	NATO two-letter code BK	LOC MARC code BN
ITU Maritime ID 478	ITU letter code BIH	FIPS country code BK	License plate code BIH
GS1 GTIN prefix 387	UNDP country code BIH	WMO country code BG	ITU callsign prefixes E7A-E7Z

=== Botswana ===
ISO 3166-1 numeric 072	ISO 3166-1 alpha-3 BWA	ISO 3166-1 alpha-2 BW	ICAO airport code prefix FB
E.164 code 267	IOC country code BOT	Country code top-level domain.bw	ICAO aircraft regis. prefix A2-
E.212 mobile country code 652	NATO three-letter code BWA	NATO two-letter code BC	LOC MARC code BS
ITU Maritime ID 611	ITU letter code BOT	FIPS country code BC	License plate code BW
GS1 GTIN prefix —	UNDP country code BOT	WMO country code BC	ITU callsign prefixes 8OA-8OZ, A2A-A2Z

=== Bouvet Island (dependency of Norway) ===
ISO 3166-1 numeric 074	ISO 3166-1 alpha-3 BVT	ISO 3166-1 alpha-2 BV	ICAO airport code prefix —
E.164 code —	IOC country code —	Country code top-level domain.bv	ICAO aircraft regis. prefix LN-
E.212 mobile country code 242	NATO three-letter code BVT	NATO two-letter code BV	LOC MARC code BV
ITU Maritime ID —	ITU letter code BVT	FIPS country code BV	License plate code —
GS1 GTIN prefix —	UNDP country code —	WMO country code BV	ITU callsign prefixes —

=== Brazil ===
ISO 3166-1 numeric 076	ISO 3166-1 alpha-3 BRA	ISO 3166-1 alpha-2 BR	ICAO airport code prefix SB, SD, SN, SS, SW
E.164 code 55	IOC country code BRA	Country code top-level domain.br	ICAO aircraft regis. prefix PP-, PR-, PT-, PU-
E.212 mobile country code 724	NATO three-letter code BRA	NATO two-letter code BR	LOC MARC code BL
ITU Maritime ID 710	ITU letter code B	FIPS country code BR	License plate code BR
GS1 GTIN prefix 789-790	UNDP country code BRA	WMO country code BZ	ITU callsign prefixes PPA-PYZ, ZVA-ZZZ

=== British Indian Ocean Territory (territory of the UK) ===
ISO 3166-1 numeric 086	ISO 3166-1 alpha-3 IOT	ISO 3166-1 alpha-2 IO	ICAO airport code prefix FJ
E.164 code 246	IOC country code —	Country code top-level domain.io	ICAO aircraft regis. prefix G-
E.212 mobile country code —	NATO three-letter code IOT	NATO two-letter code IO	LOC MARC code BI
ITU Maritime ID —	ITU letter code BIO	FIPS country code IO	License plate code —
GS1 GTIN prefix —	UNDP country code —	WMO country code BT	ITU callsign prefixes —

=== Brunei ===
ISO 3166-1 numeric 096	ISO 3166-1 alpha-3 BRN	ISO 3166-1 alpha-2 BN	ICAO airport code prefix WB
E.164 code 673	IOC country code BRU	Country code top-level domain.bn	ICAO aircraft regis. prefix V8-
E.212 mobile country code 528	NATO three-letter code BRN	NATO two-letter code BX	LOC MARC code BX
ITU Maritime ID 508	ITU letter code BRU	FIPS country code BX	License plate code BRU
GS1 GTIN prefix 623	UNDP country code BRU	WMO country code BD	ITU callsign prefixes V8A-V8Z

=== Bulgaria ===
ISO 3166-1 numeric 100	ISO 3166-1 alpha-3 BGR	ISO 3166-1 alpha-2 BG	ICAO airport code prefix LB
E.164 code 359	IOC country code BUL	Country code top-level domain.bg	ICAO aircraft regis. prefix LZ-
E.212 mobile country code 284	NATO three-letter code BGR	NATO two-letter code BU	LOC MARC code BU
ITU Maritime ID 207	ITU letter code BUL	FIPS country code BU	License plate code BG
GS1 GTIN prefix 380	UNDP country code BUL	WMO country code BU	ITU callsign prefixes LZA-LZZ

=== Burkina Faso ===
ISO 3166-1 numeric 854	ISO 3166-1 alpha-3 BFA	ISO 3166-1 alpha-2 BF	ICAO airport code prefix DF
E.164 code 226	IOC country code BUR	Country code top-level domain.bf	ICAO aircraft regis. prefix XT-
E.212 mobile country code 613	NATO three-letter code BFA	NATO two-letter code UV	LOC MARC code UV
ITU Maritime ID 633	ITU letter code BFA	FIPS country code UV	License plate code BF
GS1 GTIN prefix —	UNDP country code BKF	WMO country code HV	ITU callsign prefixes XTA-XTZ

=== Burundi ===
ISO 3166-1 numeric 108	ISO 3166-1 alpha-3 BDI	ISO 3166-1 alpha-2 BI	ICAO airport code prefix HB
E.164 code 257	IOC country code BDI	Country code top-level domain.bi	ICAO aircraft regis. prefix 9U-
E.212 mobile country code 642	NATO three-letter code BDI	NATO two-letter code BY	LOC MARC code BD
ITU Maritime ID 609	ITU letter code BDI	FIPS country code BY	License plate code RU
GS1 GTIN prefix —	UNDP country code BDI	WMO country code BI	ITU callsign prefixes 9UA-9UZ

== C ==
=== Cambodia ===
ISO 3166-1 numeric 116	ISO 3166-1 alpha-3 KHM	ISO 3166-1 alpha-2 KH	ICAO airport code prefix VD
E.164 code 855	IOC country code CAM	Country code top-level domain.kh	ICAO aircraft regis. prefix XU-
E.212 mobile country code 456	NATO three-letter code KHM	NATO two-letter code CB	LOC MARC code CB
ITU Maritime ID 514, 515	ITU letter code CBG	FIPS country code CB	License plate code K
GS1 GTIN prefix 884	UNDP country code CMB	WMO country code KP	ITU callsign prefixes XUA-XUZ

=== Cameroon ===
ISO 3166-1 numeric 120	ISO 3166-1 alpha-3 CMR	ISO 3166-1 alpha-2 CM	ICAO airport code prefix FK
E.164 code 237	IOC country code CMR	Country code top-level domain.cm	ICAO aircraft regis. prefix TJ-
E.212 mobile country code 624	NATO three-letter code CMR	NATO two-letter code CM	LOC MARC code CM
ITU Maritime ID 613	ITU letter code CME	FIPS country code CM	License plate code CAM
GS1 GTIN prefix 617	UNDP country code CMR	WMO country code CM	ITU callsign prefixes TJA-TJZ

=== Canada ===
ISO 3166-1 numeric 124	ISO 3166-1 alpha-3 CAN	ISO 3166-1 alpha-2 CA	ICAO airport code prefix C
E.164 code 1	IOC country code CAN	Country code top-level domain.ca	ICAO aircraft regis. prefix C-, CF-, CG-
E.212 mobile country code 302	NATO three-letter code CAN	NATO two-letter code CA	LOC MARC code CN
ITU Maritime ID 316	ITU letter code CAN	FIPS country code CA	License plate code CDN
GS1 GTIN prefix 000-139, 754-755	UNDP country code CAN	WMO country code CN	ITU callsign prefixes CFA-CKZ, CYA-CZZ, VAA-VGZ; VOA-VOZ, VXA-VYZ, XJA-XOZ

=== Cape Verde ===
ISO 3166-1 numeric 132	ISO 3166-1 alpha-3 CPV	ISO 3166-1 alpha-2 CV	ICAO airport code prefix GV
E.164 code 238	IOC country code CPV	Country code top-level domain.cv	ICAO aircraft regis. prefix D4-
E.212 mobile country code 625	NATO three-letter code CPV	NATO two-letter code CV	LOC MARC code CV
ITU Maritime ID 617	ITU letter code CPV	FIPS country code CV	License plate code CV (unofficial)
GS1 GTIN prefix —	UNDP country code CVI	WMO country code CV	ITU callsign prefixes D4A-D4Z

=== Caribbean Netherlands ===
ISO 3166-1 numeric 535	ISO 3166-1 alpha-3 BES	ISO 3166-1 alpha-2 BQ	ICAO airport code prefix TN
E.164 code 599	IOC country code —	Country code top-level domain.bq	ICAO aircraft regis. prefix —
E.212 mobile country code —	NATO three-letter code —	NATO two-letter code —	LOC MARC code CA
ITU Maritime ID —	ITU letter code —	FIPS country code —	License plate code —
GS1 GTIN prefix —	UNDP country code —	WMO country code —	ITU callsign prefixes PJA-PJZ

=== Cayman Islands (British territory) ===
ISO 3166-1 numeric 136	ISO 3166-1 alpha-3 CYM	ISO 3166-1 alpha-2 KY	ICAO airport code prefix MW
E.164 code 1	IOC country code CAY	Country code top-level domain.ky	ICAO aircraft regis. prefix VR-C-
E.212 mobile country code 346	NATO three-letter code CYM	NATO two-letter code CJ	LOC MARC code CJ
ITU Maritime ID 319	ITU letter code CYM	FIPS country code CJ	License plate code —
GS1 GTIN prefix —	UNDP country code CAY	WMO country code GC	ITU callsign prefixes —

=== Central African Republic ===
ISO 3166-1 numeric 140	ISO 3166-1 alpha-3 CAF	ISO 3166-1 alpha-2 CF	ICAO airport code prefix FE
E.164 code 236	IOC country code CAF	Country code top-level domain.cf	ICAO aircraft regis. prefix TL-
E.212 mobile country code 623	NATO three-letter code CAF	NATO two-letter code CT	LOC MARC code CX
ITU Maritime ID 612	ITU letter code CAF	FIPS country code CT	License plate code RCA
GS1 GTIN prefix —	UNDP country code CAF	WMO country code CE	ITU callsign prefixes TLA-TLZ

Other:

- FIFA: CTA

=== Chad ===
ISO 3166-1 numeric 148	ISO 3166-1 alpha-3 TCD	ISO 3166-1 alpha-2 TD	ICAO airport code prefix FT
E.164 code 235	IOC country code CHA	Country code top-level domain.td	ICAO aircraft regis. prefix TT-
E.212 mobile country code 622	NATO three-letter code TCD	NATO two-letter code CD	LOC MARC code CD
ITU Maritime ID 670	ITU letter code TCD	FIPS country code CD	License plate code TCH, TD
GS1 GTIN prefix —	UNDP country code CHD	WMO country code CD	ITU callsign prefixes TTA-TTZ

=== Chile ===
ISO 3166-1 numeric 152	ISO 3166-1 alpha-3 CHL	ISO 3166-1 alpha-2 CL	ICAO airport code prefix SC, NE
E.164 code 56	IOC country code CHI	Country code top-level domain.cl	ICAO aircraft regis. prefix CC-
E.212 mobile country code 730	NATO three-letter code CHL	NATO two-letter code CI	LOC MARC code CL
ITU Maritime ID 725	ITU letter code CHL	FIPS country code CI	License plate code RCH
GS1 GTIN prefix 780	UNDP country code CHI	WMO country code CH	ITU callsign prefixes 3GA-3GZ,CAA-CEZ,XQA-XRZ

=== Mainland China ===
ISO 3166-1 numeric 156	ISO 3166-1 alpha-3 CHN	ISO 3166-1 alpha-2 CN	ICAO airport code prefix Z
E.164 code 86	IOC country code CHN	Country code top-level domain.cn	ICAO aircraft regis. prefix B- rear end：Four Numbcode (English letters/International Numbers)
E.212 mobile country code 460, 461	NATO three-letter code CHN	NATO two-letter code CH	LOC MARC code CC
ITU Maritime ID 412, 413	ITU letter code CHN	FIPS country code CH	License plate code CHN (Not internationally recognized)
GS1 GTIN prefix 690-699	UNDP country code CPR	WMO country code CI	ITU callsign prefixes B

=== Christmas Island (territory of Australia) ===
ISO 3166-1 numeric 162	ISO 3166-1 alpha-3 CXR	ISO 3166-1 alpha-2 CX	ICAO airport code prefix YP
E.164 code 61	IOC country code —	Country code top-level domain.cx	ICAO aircraft regis. prefix VH-
E.212 mobile country code 505	NATO three-letter code CXR	NATO two-letter code KT	LOC MARC code XA
ITU Maritime ID 516	ITU letter code CHR	FIPS country code KT	License plate code —
GS1 GTIN prefix —	UNDP country code —	WMO country code KI	ITU callsign prefixes —

=== Cocos (Keeling) Islands (territory of Australia) ===
ISO 3166-1 numeric 166	ISO 3166-1 alpha-3 CCK	ISO 3166-1 alpha-2 CC	ICAO airport code prefix —
E.164 code 61	IOC country code —	Country code top-level domain.cc	ICAO aircraft regis. prefix VH-
E.212 mobile country code 505	NATO three-letter code CCK	NATO two-letter code CK	LOC MARC code XB
ITU Maritime ID 523	ITU letter code ICO	FIPS country code CK	License plate code —
GS1 GTIN prefix —	UNDP country code —	WMO country code KK	ITU callsign prefixes —

=== Colombia ===
ISO 3166-1 numeric 170	ISO 3166-1 alpha-3 COL	ISO 3166-1 alpha-2 CO	ICAO airport code prefix SK
E.164 code 57	IOC country code COL	Country code top-level domain.co	ICAO aircraft regis. prefix HJ-, HK-
E.212 mobile country code 732	NATO three-letter code COL	NATO two-letter code CO	LOC MARC code CK
ITU Maritime ID 730	ITU letter code CLM	FIPS country code CO	License plate code CO
GS1 GTIN prefix 770-771	UNDP country code COL	WMO country code CO	ITU callsign prefixes 5JA-5KZ, HJA-HKZ

=== Comoros ===
ISO 3166-1 numeric 174	ISO 3166-1 alpha-3 COM	ISO 3166-1 alpha-2 KM	ICAO airport code prefix FMC
E.164 code 269	IOC country code COM	Country code top-level domain.km	ICAO aircraft regis. prefix D6-
E.212 mobile country code 654	NATO three-letter code COM	NATO two-letter code CN	LOC MARC code CQ
ITU Maritime ID 616	ITU letter code COM	FIPS country code CN	License plate code COM (unofficial)
GS1 GTIN prefix —	UNDP country code COI	WMO country code IC	ITU callsign prefixes D6A-D6Z

=== Democratic Republic of the Congo ===
ISO 3166-1 numeric 180	ISO 3166-1 alpha-3 COD	ISO 3166-1 alpha-2 CD	ICAO airport code prefix FZ
E.164 code 243	IOC country code COD	Country code top-level domain.cd	ICAO aircraft regis. prefix 9Q-
E.212 mobile country code 630	NATO three-letter code COD	NATO two-letter code CG	LOC MARC code CG
ITU Maritime ID 676	ITU letter code COD	FIPS country code CG	License plate code ZRE
GS1 GTIN prefix —	UNDP country code ZAI (Note: formerly Zaire (1997))	WMO country code ZR	ITU callsign prefixes 9OA-9TZ

=== Republic of the Congo ===
ISO 3166-1 numeric 178	ISO 3166-1 alpha-3 COG	ISO 3166-1 alpha-2 CG	ICAO airport code prefix FC
E.164 code 242	IOC country code CGO	Country code top-level domain.cg	ICAO aircraft regis. prefix TN-
E.212 mobile country code 629	NATO three-letter code COG	NATO two-letter code CF	LOC MARC code CF
ITU Maritime ID 615	ITU letter code COG	FIPS country code CF	License plate code RCB
GS1 GTIN prefix —	UNDP country code PRC (Note: formerly People's Republic of Congo (1970–1992))	WMO country code CG	ITU callsign prefixes TNA-TNZ

=== Cook Islands (associated with New Zealand) ===
ISO 3166-1 numeric 184	ISO 3166-1 alpha-3 COK	ISO 3166-1 alpha-2 CK	ICAO airport code prefix NC
E.164 code 682	IOC country code COK	Country code top-level domain.ck	ICAO aircraft regis. prefix —
E.212 mobile country code 548	NATO three-letter code COK	NATO two-letter code CW	LOC MARC code CW
ITU Maritime ID 518	ITU letter code CKH	FIPS country code CW	License plate code COK (unofficial)
GS1 GTIN prefix —	UNDP country code CKI	WMO country code KU	ITU callsign prefixes E5A-E5Z

=== Costa Rica ===
ISO 3166-1 numeric 188	ISO 3166-1 alpha-3 CRI	ISO 3166-1 alpha-2 CR	ICAO airport code prefix MR
E.164 code 506	IOC country code CRC	Country code top-level domain.cr	ICAO aircraft regis. prefix TI-
E.212 mobile country code 712	NATO three-letter code CRI	NATO two-letter code CS	LOC MARC code CR
ITU Maritime ID 321	ITU letter code CTR	FIPS country code CS	License plate code CR
GS1 GTIN prefix 744	UNDP country code COS	WMO country code CS	ITU callsign prefixes TEA-TEZ, TIA-TIZ

=== Croatia ===
ISO 3166-1 numeric 191	ISO 3166-1 alpha-3 HRV	ISO 3166-1 alpha-2 HR	ICAO airport code prefix LD
E.164 code 385	IOC country code CRO	Country code top-level domain.hr	ICAO aircraft regis. prefix 9A-
E.212 mobile country code 219	NATO three-letter code HRV	NATO two-letter code HR	LOC MARC code CI
ITU Maritime ID 238	ITU letter code HRV	FIPS country code HR	License plate code HR
GS1 GTIN prefix 385	UNDP country code CRO	WMO country code HR	ITU callsign prefixes 9AA-9AZ

=== Cuba ===
ISO 3166-1 numeric 192	ISO 3166-1 alpha-3 CUB	ISO 3166-1 alpha-2 CU	ICAO airport code prefix MU
E.164 code 53	IOC country code CUB	Country code top-level domain.cu	ICAO aircraft regis. prefix CU-
E.212 mobile country code 368	NATO three-letter code CUB	NATO two-letter code CU	LOC MARC code CU
ITU Maritime ID 323	ITU letter code CUB	FIPS country code CU	License plate code CU
GS1 GTIN prefix 850	UNDP country code CUB	WMO country code CU	ITU callsign prefixes CLA-CMZ,COA-COZ,T4A-T4Z

=== Curaçao (Kingdom of the Netherlands) ===
ISO 3166-1 numeric 531	ISO 3166-1 alpha-3 CUW	ISO 3166-1 alpha-2 CW	ICAO airport code prefix TN
E.164 code 599	IOC country code —	Country code top-level domain.cw	ICAO aircraft regis. prefix PJ
E.212 mobile country code 362	NATO three-letter code —	NATO two-letter code —	LOC MARC code CO
ITU Maritime ID 306	ITU letter code CUW	FIPS country code UC	License plate code —
GS1 GTIN prefix —	UNDP country code —	WMO country code NU	ITU callsign prefixes PJA-PJZ

=== Cyprus ===
ISO 3166-1 numeric 196	ISO 3166-1 alpha-3 CYP	ISO 3166-1 alpha-2 CY	ICAO airport code prefix LC
E.164 code 357	IOC country code CYP	Country code top-level domain.cy	ICAO aircraft regis. prefix 5B-
E.212 mobile country code 280	NATO three-letter code CYP	NATO two-letter code CY	LOC MARC code CY
ITU Maritime ID 209, 210, 212	ITU letter code CYP	FIPS country code CY	License plate code CY
GS1 GTIN prefix 529	UNDP country code CYP	WMO country code CY	ITU callsign prefixes 5BA-5BZ, C4A-C4Z; H2A-H2Z, P3A-P3Z

=== Czech Republic ===
ISO 3166-1 numeric 203	ISO 3166-1 alpha-3 CZE	ISO 3166-1 alpha-2 CZ	ICAO airport code prefix LK
E.164 code 420	IOC country code CZE	Country code top-level domain.cz	ICAO aircraft regis. prefix OK-
E.212 mobile country code 230	NATO three-letter code CZE	NATO two-letter code CZ	LOC MARC code XR
ITU Maritime ID 270	ITU letter code CZE	FIPS country code EZ	License plate code CZ
GS1 GTIN prefix 859	UNDP country code CEH	WMO country code CZ	ITU callsign prefixes OKA-OLZ

== D ==
=== Denmark ===
ISO 3166-1 numeric 208	ISO 3166-1 alpha-3 DNK	ISO 3166-1 alpha-2 DK	ICAO airport code prefix EK (Note: BG is Greenland)
E.164 code 45	IOC country code DEN	Country code top-level domain.dk	ICAO aircraft regis. prefix OY-
E.212 mobile country code 238	NATO three-letter code DNK	NATO two-letter code DA	LOC MARC code DK
ITU Maritime ID 219, 220	ITU letter code DNK	FIPS country code DA	License plate code DK
GS1 GTIN prefix 570-579	UNDP country code DEN	WMO country code DN	ITU callsign prefixes 5PA-5QZ,OUA-OZZ,XPA-XPZ

=== Djibouti ===
ISO 3166-1 numeric 262	ISO 3166-1 alpha-3 DJI	ISO 3166-1 alpha-2 DJ	ICAO airport code prefix HD
E.164 code 253	IOC country code DJI	Country code top-level domain.dj	ICAO aircraft regis. prefix J2-
E.212 mobile country code 638	NATO three-letter code DJI	NATO two-letter code DJ	LOC MARC code FT
ITU Maritime ID 621	ITU letter code DJI	FIPS country code DJ	License plate code DJI (unofficial)
GS1 GTIN prefix —	UNDP country code DJI	WMO country code DJ	ITU callsign prefixes J2A-J2Z

=== Dominica ===
ISO 3166-1 numeric 212	ISO 3166-1 alpha-3 DMA	ISO 3166-1 alpha-2 DM	ICAO airport code prefix TD
E.164 code 1	IOC country code DMA	Country code top-level domain.dm	ICAO aircraft regis. prefix J7-
E.212 mobile country code 356	NATO three-letter code DMA	NATO two-letter code DO	LOC MARC code DQ
ITU Maritime ID 325	ITU letter code DMA	FIPS country code DO	License plate code WD
GS1 GTIN prefix —	UNDP country code DMI	WMO country code DO	ITU callsign prefixes J7A-J7Z

=== Dominican Republic ===
ISO 3166-1 numeric 214	ISO 3166-1 alpha-3 DOM	ISO 3166-1 alpha-2 DO	ICAO airport code prefix MD
E.164 code 1	IOC country code DOM	Country code top-level domain.do	ICAO aircraft regis. prefix HI-
E.212 mobile country code 370	NATO three-letter code DOM	NATO two-letter code DR	LOC MARC code DR
ITU Maritime ID 327	ITU letter code DOM	FIPS country code DR	License plate code DOM
GS1 GTIN prefix 746	UNDP country code DOM	WMO country code DR	ITU callsign prefixes HIA-HIZ

== E ==
=== Ecuador ===
ISO 3166-1 numeric 218	ISO 3166-1 alpha-3 ECU	ISO 3166-1 alpha-2 EC	ICAO airport code prefix SE
E.164 code 593	IOC country code ECU	Country code top-level domain.ec	ICAO aircraft regis. prefix HC-
E.212 mobile country code 740	NATO three-letter code ECU	NATO two-letter code EC	LOC MARC code EC
ITU Maritime ID 735	ITU letter code EQA	FIPS country code EC	License plate code EC
GS1 GTIN prefix 786	UNDP country code ECU	WMO country code EQ	ITU callsign prefixes HCA-HDZ

=== Egypt ===
ISO 3166-1 numeric 818	ISO 3166-1 alpha-3 EGY	ISO 3166-1 alpha-2 EG	ICAO airport code prefix HE
E.164 code 20	IOC country code EGY	Country code top-level domain.eg	ICAO aircraft regis. prefix SU-
E.212 mobile country code 602	NATO three-letter code EGY	NATO two-letter code EG	LOC MARC code UA
ITU Maritime ID 622	ITU letter code EGY	FIPS country code EG	License plate code ET
GS1 GTIN prefix 622	UNDP country code EGY	WMO country code EG	ITU callsign prefixes 6AA-6BZ,SSA-SSM,SUA-SUZ

=== El Salvador ===
ISO 3166-1 numeric 222	ISO 3166-1 alpha-3 SLV	ISO 3166-1 alpha-2 SV	ICAO airport code prefix MS
E.164 code 503	IOC country code ESA	Country code top-level domain.sv	ICAO aircraft regis. prefix YS-
E.212 mobile country code 706	NATO three-letter code SLV	NATO two-letter code ES	LOC MARC code ES
ITU Maritime ID 359	ITU letter code SLV	FIPS country code ES	License plate code ES
GS1 GTIN prefix 741	UNDP country code ELS	WMO country code ES	ITU callsign prefixes HUA-HUZ, YSA-YSZ

=== Equatorial Guinea ===
ISO 3166-1 numeric 226	ISO 3166-1 alpha-3 GNQ	ISO 3166-1 alpha-2 GQ	ICAO airport code prefix FG
E.164 code 240	IOC country code GEQ	Country code top-level domain.gq	ICAO aircraft regis. prefix 3C-
E.212 mobile country code 627	NATO three-letter code GNQ	NATO two-letter code EK	LOC MARC code EG
ITU Maritime ID 631	ITU letter code GNE	FIPS country code EK	License plate code GQ (unofficial)
GS1 GTIN prefix —	UNDP country code EQG	WMO country code GQ	ITU callsign prefixes 3CA-3CZ

Other:

- FIFA: EQG

=== Eritrea ===
ISO 3166-1 numeric 232	ISO 3166-1 alpha-3 ERI	ISO 3166-1 alpha-2 ER	ICAO airport code prefix HH
E.164 code +291	IOC country code ERI	Country code top-level domain.er	ICAO aircraft regis. prefix E3-
E.212 mobile country code 657	NATO three-letter code ERI	NATO two-letter code ER	LOC MARC code EA
ITU Maritime ID 625	ITU letter code ERI	FIPS country code ER	License plate code ER
GS1 GTIN prefix —	UNDP country code ERI	WMO country code E1	ITU callsign prefixes E3A-E3Z

=== Estonia ===
ISO 3166-1 numeric 233	ISO 3166-1 alpha-3 EST	ISO 3166-1 alpha-2 EE	ICAO airport code prefix EE
E.164 code 372	IOC country code EST	Country code top-level domain.ee	ICAO aircraft regis. prefix ES-
E.212 mobile country code 248	NATO three-letter code EST	NATO two-letter code EN	LOC MARC code ER
ITU Maritime ID 276	ITU letter code EST	FIPS country code EN	License plate code EST
GS1 GTIN prefix 474	UNDP country code EST	WMO country code EO	ITU callsign prefixes ESA-ESZ

=== Eswatini ===
ISO 3166-1 numeric 748	ISO 3166-1 alpha-3 SWZ	ISO 3166-1 alpha-2 SZ	ICAO airport code prefix FD
E.164 code 268	IOC country code SWZ	Country code top-level domain.sz	ICAO aircraft regis. prefix 3D-
E.212 mobile country code 653	NATO three-letter code SWZ	NATO two-letter code WZ	LOC MARC code SQ
ITU Maritime ID 669	ITU letter code SWZ	FIPS country code WZ	License plate code SD
GS1 GTIN prefix —	UNDP country code SWA	WMO country code SV	ITU callsign prefixes 3DA-3DM

=== Ethiopia ===
ISO 3166-1 numeric 231	ISO 3166-1 alpha-3 ETH	ISO 3166-1 alpha-2 ET	ICAO airport code prefix HA
E.164 code 251	IOC country code ETH	Country code top-level domain.et	ICAO aircraft regis. prefix ET-
E.212 mobile country code 636	NATO three-letter code ETH	NATO two-letter code ET	LOC MARC code ET
ITU Maritime ID 624	ITU letter code ETH	FIPS country code ET	License plate code ETH
GS1 GTIN prefix —	UNDP country code ETH	WMO country code ET	ITU callsign prefixes 9EA-9FZ, ETA-ETZ

== F ==
=== Falkland Islands (British territory) ===
ISO 3166-1 numeric 238	ISO 3166-1 alpha-3 FLK	ISO 3166-1 alpha-2 FK	ICAO airport code prefix SF
E.164 code 500	IOC country code —	Country code top-level domain.fk	ICAO aircraft regis. prefix VP-F-
E.212 mobile country code —	NATO three-letter code FLK	NATO two-letter code FK	LOC MARC code FK
ITU Maritime ID 740	ITU letter code FLK	FIPS country code FK	License plate code —
GS1 GTIN prefix —	UNDP country code —	WMO country code FK	ITU callsign prefixes —

Other:

- IIGA: FAL

=== Faroe Islands (Kingdom of Denmark) ===
ISO 3166-1 numeric 234	ISO 3166-1 alpha-3 FRO	ISO 3166-1 alpha-2 FO	ICAO airport code prefix EK
E.164 code 298	IOC country code -	Country code top-level domain.fo	ICAO aircraft regis. prefix G-
E.212 mobile country code 288	NATO three-letter code FRO	NATO two-letter code FO	LOC MARC code FA
ITU Maritime ID 231	ITU letter code FRO	FIPS country code FO	License plate code FO
GS1 GTIN prefix —	UNDP country code —	WMO country code FA	ITU callsign prefixes —

Other:

- IIGA: FAR

=== Fiji ===
ISO 3166-1 numeric 242	ISO 3166-1 alpha-3 FJI	ISO 3166-1 alpha-2 FJ	ICAO airport code prefix NF
E.164 code 679	IOC country code FIJ	Country code top-level domain.fj	ICAO aircraft regis. prefix DQ-
E.212 mobile country code 542	NATO three-letter code FJI	NATO two-letter code FJ	LOC MARC code FJ
ITU Maritime ID 520	ITU letter code FJI	FIPS country code FJ	License plate code FJI
GS1 GTIN prefix —	UNDP country code FIJ	WMO country code FJ	ITU callsign prefixes 3DN-3DZ

=== Finland ===
ISO 3166-1 numeric 246	ISO 3166-1 alpha-3 FIN	ISO 3166-1 alpha-2 FI	ICAO airport code prefix EF
E.164 code 358	IOC country code FIN	Country code top-level domain.fi	ICAO aircraft regis. prefix OH-
E.212 mobile country code 244	NATO three-letter code FIN	NATO two-letter code FI	LOC MARC code FI
ITU Maritime ID 230	ITU letter code FIN	FIPS country code FI	License plate code FIN
GS1 GTIN prefix 640-649	UNDP country code FIN	WMO country code FI	ITU callsign prefixes OFA-OJZ

=== France ===
ISO 3166-1 numeric 250	ISO 3166-1 alpha-3 FRA	ISO 3166-1 alpha-2 FR	ICAO airport code prefix LF
E.164 code 33	IOC country code FRA	Country code top-level domain.fr	ICAO aircraft regis. prefix F-
E.212 mobile country code 208	NATO three-letter code FRA	NATO two-letter code FR	LOC MARC code FR
ITU Maritime ID 226-228	ITU letter code F	FIPS country code FR	License plate code F
GS1 GTIN prefix 300-379	UNDP country code FRA	WMO country code FR	ITU callsign prefixes FAA-FZZ, HWA-HYZ, THA-THZ, TKA-TKZ; TMA-TMZ, TOA-TQZ, TVA-TXZ

=== French Guiana (department of France) ===
ISO 3166-1 numeric 254	ISO 3166-1 alpha-3 GUF	ISO 3166-1 alpha-2 GF	ICAO airport code prefix SO
E.164 code 594	IOC country code —	Country code top-level domain.gf	ICAO aircraft regis. prefix F-
E.212 mobile country code 742	NATO three-letter code GUF	NATO two-letter code FG	LOC MARC code FG
ITU Maritime ID 745	ITU letter code GUF	FIPS country code FG	License plate code F
GS1 GTIN prefix —	UNDP country code FGU	WMO country code FG	ITU callsign prefixes —

=== French Polynesia (French overseas collectivity) ===
ISO 3166-1 numeric 258	ISO 3166-1 alpha-3 PYF	ISO 3166-1 alpha-2 PF	ICAO airport code prefix NT
E.164 code 689	IOC country code —	Country code top-level domain.pf	ICAO aircraft regis. prefix F-
E.212 mobile country code 547	NATO three-letter code PYF	NATO two-letter code FP	LOC MARC code FP
ITU Maritime ID 546	ITU letter code OCE	FIPS country code FP	License plate code F
GS1 GTIN prefix —	UNDP country code FPL	WMO country code PF	ITU callsign prefixes —

Other:

- FIFA: TAH (for Tahiti)

=== French Southern and Antarctic Lands (territory of France) ===
ISO 3166-1 numeric 260	ISO 3166-1 alpha-3 ATF	ISO 3166-1 alpha-2 TF	ICAO airport code prefix —
E.164 code 262	IOC country code —	Country code top-level domain.tf	ICAO aircraft regis. prefix F-
E.212 mobile country code —	NATO three-letter code ATF	NATO two-letter code FS	LOC MARC code FS
ITU Maritime ID 501	ITU letter code —	FIPS country code FS	License plate code F
GS1 GTIN prefix —	UNDP country code —	WMO country code FR	ITU callsign prefixes —

== G ==
=== Gabon ===
ISO 3166-1 numeric 266	ISO 3166-1 alpha-3 GAB	ISO 3166-1 alpha-2 GA	ICAO airport code prefix FO
E.164 code 241	IOC country code GAB	Country code top-level domain.ga	ICAO aircraft regis. prefix TR-
E.212 mobile country code 628	NATO three-letter code GAB	NATO two-letter code GB	LOC MARC code GO
ITU Maritime ID 626	ITU letter code GAB	FIPS country code GB	License plate code G
GS1 GTIN prefix —	UNDP country code GAB	WMO country code GO	ITU callsign prefixes TRA-TRZ

=== The Gambia ===
ISO 3166-1 numeric 270	ISO 3166-1 alpha-3 GMB	ISO 3166-1 alpha-2 GM	ICAO airport code prefix GB
E.164 code 220	IOC country code GAM	Country code top-level domain.gm	ICAO aircraft regis. prefix C5-
E.212 mobile country code 607	NATO three-letter code GMB	NATO two-letter code GA	LOC MARC code GM
ITU Maritime ID 629	ITU letter code GMB	FIPS country code GA	License plate code WAG
GS1 GTIN prefix —	UNDP country code GAM	WMO country code GB	ITU callsign prefixes C5A-C5Z

=== Georgia ===
ISO 3166-1 numeric 268	ISO 3166-1 alpha-3 GEO	ISO 3166-1 alpha-2 GE	ICAO airport code prefix UG
E.164 code 995	IOC country code GEO	Country code top-level domain.ge	ICAO aircraft regis. prefix 4L-
E.212 mobile country code 282	NATO three-letter code GEO	NATO two-letter code GG	LOC MARC code GS
ITU Maritime ID 213	ITU letter code GEO	FIPS country code GG	License plate code GE
GS1 GTIN prefix 486	UNDP country code GEO	WMO country code GG	ITU callsign prefixes 4LA-4LZ

=== Germany ===
ISO 3166-1 numeric 276	ISO 3166-1 alpha-3 DEU	ISO 3166-1 alpha-2 DE	ICAO airport code prefix ED, ET
E.164 code 49	IOC country code GER	Country code top-level domain.de	ICAO aircraft regis. prefix D-
E.212 mobile country code 262	NATO three-letter code DEU	NATO two-letter code GE	LOC MARC code GW
ITU Maritime ID 211, 218	ITU letter code D	FIPS country code GM	License plate code D
GS1 GTIN prefix 400-440	UNDP country code GER	WMO country code DL	ITU callsign prefixes DAA-DRZ, Y2A-Y9Z

=== Ghana ===
ISO 3166-1 numeric 288	ISO 3166-1 alpha-3 GHA	ISO 3166-1 alpha-2 GH	ICAO airport code prefix DG
E.164 code 233	IOC country code GHA	Country code top-level domain.gh	ICAO aircraft regis. prefix 9G-
E.212 mobile country code 620	NATO three-letter code GHA	NATO two-letter code GH	LOC MARC code GH
ITU Maritime ID 627	ITU letter code GHA	FIPS country code GH	License plate code GH
GS1 GTIN prefix 603	UNDP country code GHA	WMO country code GH	ITU callsign prefixes 9GA-9GZ

=== Gibraltar (British territory) ===
ISO 3166-1 numeric 292	ISO 3166-1 alpha-3 GIB	ISO 3166-1 alpha-2 GI	ICAO airport code prefix LX
E.164 code 350	IOC country code —	Country code top-level domain.gi	ICAO aircraft regis. prefix VR-G-
E.212 mobile country code 266	NATO three-letter code GIB	NATO two-letter code GI	LOC MARC code GI
ITU Maritime ID 236	ITU letter code GIB	FIPS country code GI	License plate code GBZ
GS1 GTIN prefix —	UNDP country code —	WMO country code GI	ITU callsign prefixes —

=== Greece ===
ISO 3166-1 numeric 300	ISO 3166-1 alpha-3 GRC	ISO 3166-1 alpha-2 GR	ICAO airport code prefix LG
E.164 code 30	IOC country code GRE	Country code top-level domain.gr	ICAO aircraft regis. prefix SX-
E.212 mobile country code 202	NATO three-letter code GRC	NATO two-letter code GR	LOC MARC code GR
ITU Maritime ID 237, 239, 240, 241	ITU letter code GRC	FIPS country code GR	License plate code GR
GS1 GTIN prefix 520-521	UNDP country code GRE	WMO country code GR	ITU callsign prefixes J4A-J4Z, SVA-SZZ

=== Greenland (Kingdom of Denmark) ===
ISO 3166-1 numeric 304	ISO 3166-1 alpha-3 GRL	ISO 3166-1 alpha-2 GL	ICAO airport code prefix BG
E.164 code 299	IOC country code —	Country code top-level domain.gl	ICAO aircraft regis. prefix OY-
E.212 mobile country code 290	NATO three-letter code GRL	NATO two-letter code GL	LOC MARC code GL
ITU Maritime ID 331	ITU letter code GRL	FIPS country code GL	License plate code KN (unofficial)
GS1 GTIN prefix —	UNDP country code —	WMO country code GL	ITU callsign prefixes —

Other:

- IIGA: GRE

=== Grenada ===
ISO 3166-1 numeric 308	ISO 3166-1 alpha-3 GRD	ISO 3166-1 alpha-2 GD	ICAO airport code prefix TG
E.164 code 1	IOC country code GRN	Country code top-level domain.gd	ICAO aircraft regis. prefix J3-
E.212 mobile country code 352	NATO three-letter code GRD	NATO two-letter code GJ	LOC MARC code GD
ITU Maritime ID 330	ITU letter code GRD	FIPS country code GJ	License plate code WG
GS1 GTIN prefix —	UNDP country code GRN	WMO country code GD	ITU callsign prefixes J3A-J3Z

=== Guadeloupe (region of France) ===
ISO 3166-1 numeric 312	ISO 3166-1 alpha-3 GLP	ISO 3166-1 alpha-2 GP	ICAO airport code prefix TF
E.164 code 590	IOC country code —	Country code top-level domain.gp	ICAO aircraft regis. prefix F-
E.212 mobile country code 340	NATO three-letter code GLP	NATO two-letter code GP	LOC MARC code GP
ITU Maritime ID 329	ITU letter code GDL	FIPS country code GP	License plate code —
GS1 GTIN prefix —	UNDP country code GUD	WMO country code MF	ITU callsign prefixes —

=== Guam (territory of the US) ===
ISO 3166-1 numeric 316	ISO 3166-1 alpha-3 GUM	ISO 3166-1 alpha-2 GU	ICAO airport code prefix PG
E.164 code 1	IOC country code GUM	Country code top-level domain.gu	ICAO aircraft regis. prefix N-
E.212 mobile country code 535	NATO three-letter code GUM	NATO two-letter code GQ	LOC MARC code GU
ITU Maritime ID —	ITU letter code GUM	FIPS country code GQ	License plate code —
GS1 GTIN prefix —	UNDP country code —	WMO country code GM	ITU callsign prefixes —

=== Guatemala ===
ISO 3166-1 numeric 320	ISO 3166-1 alpha-3 GTM	ISO 3166-1 alpha-2 GT	ICAO airport code prefix MG
E.164 code 502	IOC country code GUA	Country code top-level domain.gt	ICAO aircraft regis. prefix TG-
E.212 mobile country code 704	NATO three-letter code GTM	NATO two-letter code GT	LOC MARC code GT
ITU Maritime ID 332	ITU letter code GTM	FIPS country code GT	License plate code GCA
GS1 GTIN prefix 740	UNDP country code GUA	WMO country code GU	ITU callsign prefixes TDA-TDZ, TGA-TGZ

=== Guernsey (British Crown dependency) ===
ISO 3166-1 numeric 831	ISO 3166-1 alpha-3 GGY	ISO 3166-1 alpha-2 GG	ICAO airport code prefix EG
E.164 code —	IOC country code —	Country code top-level domain.gg	ICAO aircraft regis. prefix 2-
E.212 mobile country code —	NATO three-letter code —	NATO two-letter code —	LOC MARC code GG
ITU Maritime ID —	ITU letter code —	FIPS country code GK	License plate code GBG
GS1 GTIN prefix —	UNDP country code —	WMO country code —	ITU callsign prefixes —

Other:

- IIGA: GUE

=== Guinea ===
ISO 3166-1 numeric 324	ISO 3166-1 alpha-3 GIN	ISO 3166-1 alpha-2 GN	ICAO airport code prefix GU
E.164 code 224	IOC country code GUI	Country code top-level domain.gn	ICAO aircraft regis. prefix 3X-
E.212 mobile country code 611	NATO three-letter code GIN	NATO two-letter code GV	LOC MARC code GV
ITU Maritime ID 632	ITU letter code GUI	FIPS country code GV	License plate code RG
GS1 GTIN prefix —	UNDP country code GUI	WMO country code GN	ITU callsign prefixes 3XA-3XZ

=== Guinea-Bissau ===
ISO 3166-1 numeric 624	ISO 3166-1 alpha-3 GNB	ISO 3166-1 alpha-2 GW	ICAO airport code prefix GG
E.164 code 245	IOC country code GBS	Country code top-level domain.gw	ICAO aircraft regis. prefix J5-
E.212 mobile country code 632	NATO three-letter code GNB	NATO two-letter code PU	LOC MARC code PG
ITU Maritime ID 630	ITU letter code GNB	FIPS country code PU	License plate code GW (unofficial)
GS1 GTIN prefix —	UNDP country code GBS	WMO country code GW	ITU callsign prefixes J5A-J5Z

=== Guyana ===
ISO 3166-1 numeric 328	ISO 3166-1 alpha-3 GUY	ISO 3166-1 alpha-2 GY	ICAO airport code prefix SY
E.164 code 594	IOC country code GUY	Country code top-level domain.gy	ICAO aircraft regis. prefix 8R-
E.212 mobile country code 738	NATO three-letter code GUY	NATO two-letter code GY	LOC MARC code GY
ITU Maritime ID 750	ITU letter code GUY	FIPS country code GY	License plate code GUY
GS1 GTIN prefix —	UNDP country code GUY	WMO country code GY	ITU callsign prefixes 8RA-8RZ

== H ==
=== Haiti ===
ISO 3166-1 numeric 332	ISO 3166-1 alpha-3 HTI	ISO 3166-1 alpha-2 HT	ICAO airport code prefix MT
E.164 code 509	IOC country code HAI	Country code top-level domain.ht	ICAO aircraft regis. prefix HH-
E.212 mobile country code 372	NATO three-letter code HTI	NATO two-letter code HA	LOC MARC code HT
ITU Maritime ID 336	ITU letter code HTI	FIPS country code HA	License plate code RH
GS1 GTIN prefix —	UNDP country code HAI	WMO country code HA	ITU callsign prefixes 4VA-4VZ, HHA-HHZ

=== Heard Island and McDonald Islands (territory of Australia) ===
ISO 3166-1 numeric 334	ISO 3166-1 alpha-3 HMD	ISO 3166-1 alpha-2 HM	ICAO airport code prefix —
E.164 code 672	IOC country code —	Country code top-level domain.hm	ICAO aircraft regis. prefix VH-
E.212 mobile country code 505	NATO three-letter code HMD	NATO two-letter code HM	LOC MARC code HM
ITU Maritime ID —	ITU letter code HMD	FIPS country code HM	License plate code —
GS1 GTIN prefix —	UNDP country code —	WMO country code —	ITU callsign prefixes —

=== Honduras ===
ISO 3166-1 numeric 340	ISO 3166-1 alpha-3 HND	ISO 3166-1 alpha-2 HN	ICAO airport code prefix MH
E.164 code 504	IOC country code HON	Country code top-level domain.hn	ICAO aircraft regis. prefix HR-
E.212 mobile country code 708	NATO three-letter code HND	NATO two-letter code HO	LOC MARC code HO
ITU Maritime ID 334	ITU letter code HND	FIPS country code HO	License plate code HN (unofficial)
GS1 GTIN prefix 742	UNDP country code HON	WMO country code HO	ITU callsign prefixes HQA-HRZ

=== Hong Kong (administrative region of China) ===
ISO 3166-1 numeric 344	ISO 3166-1 alpha-3 HKG	ISO 3166-1 alpha-2 HK	ICAO airport code prefix VH
E.164 code 852	IOC country code HKG	Country code top-level domain.hk	ICAO aircraft regis. prefix B-H/B-K/B-L
E.212 mobile country code 454	NATO three-letter code HKG	NATO two-letter code HK	LOC MARC code HK
ITU Maritime ID 477	ITU letter code HKG	FIPS country code HK	License plate code HK (officially obsolete)
GS1 GTIN prefix 489	UNDP country code HOK	WMO country code HK	ITU callsign prefixes VRA-VRZ

=== Hungary ===
ISO 3166-1 numeric 348	ISO 3166-1 alpha-3 HUN	ISO 3166-1 alpha-2 HU	ICAO airport code prefix LH
E.164 code 36	IOC country code HUN	Country code top-level domain.hu	ICAO aircraft regis. prefix HA-
E.212 mobile country code 216	NATO three-letter code HUN	NATO two-letter code HU	LOC MARC code HU
ITU Maritime ID 243	ITU letter code HNG	FIPS country code HU	License plate code H
GS1 GTIN prefix 599	UNDP country code HUN	WMO country code HU	ITU callsign prefixes HAA-HGZ

== I ==
=== Iceland ===
ISO 3166-1 numeric 352	ISO 3166-1 alpha-3 ISL	ISO 3166-1 alpha-2 IS	ICAO airport code prefix BI
E.164 code 354	IOC country code ISL	Country code top-level domain.is	ICAO aircraft regis. prefix TF-
E.212 mobile country code 274	NATO three-letter code ISL	NATO two-letter code IC	LOC MARC code IC
ITU Maritime ID 251	ITU letter code ISL	FIPS country code IC	License plate code IS
GS1 GTIN prefix 569	UNDP country code ICE	WMO country code IL	ITU callsign prefixes TFA-TFZ

=== India ===
ISO 3166-1 numeric 356	ISO 3166-1 alpha-3 IND	ISO 3166-1 alpha-2 IN	ICAO airport code prefix VA, VE, VI, VO
E.164 code +91	IOC country code IND	Country code top-level domain.in	ICAO aircraft regis. prefix VT-
E.212 mobile country code 404	NATO three-letter code IND	NATO two-letter code IN	LOC MARC code II
ITU Maritime ID 419	ITU letter code IND	FIPS country code IN	License plate code IND
GS1 GTIN prefix 890	UNDP country code IND	WMO country code IN	ITU callsign prefixes 8TA-8YZ, ATA-AWZ, VTA-VWZ

=== Indonesia ===
ISO 3166-1 numeric 360	ISO 3166-1 alpha-3 IDN	ISO 3166-1 alpha-2 ID	ICAO airport code prefix WA, WI
E.164 code 62	IOC country code INA	Country code top-level domain.id	ICAO aircraft regis. prefix PK-
E.212 mobile country code 510	NATO three-letter code IDN	NATO two-letter code ID	LOC MARC code IO
ITU Maritime ID 525	ITU letter code INS	FIPS country code ID	License plate code RI
GS1 GTIN prefix 899	UNDP country code INS	WMO country code ID	ITU callsign prefixes 7AA-7IZ, 8AA-8IZ, JZA-JZZ, PKA-POZ, YBA-YHZ

=== Iran ===
ISO 3166-1 numeric 364	ISO 3166-1 alpha-3 IRN	ISO 3166-1 alpha-2 IR	ICAO airport code prefix OI
E.164 code 98	IOC country code IRI	Country code top-level domain.ir	ICAO aircraft regis. prefix EP-
E.212 mobile country code 432	NATO three-letter code IRN	NATO two-letter code IR	LOC MARC code IR
ITU Maritime ID 422	ITU letter code IRN	FIPS country code IR	License plate code IR
GS1 GTIN prefix 626	UNDP country code IRA	WMO country code IR	ITU callsign prefixes 9BA-9DZ, EPA-EQZ

=== Iraq ===
ISO 3166-1 numeric 368	ISO 3166-1 alpha-3 IRQ	ISO 3166-1 alpha-2 IQ	ICAO airport code prefix OR
E.164 code 964	IOC country code IRQ	Country code top-level domain.iq	ICAO aircraft regis. prefix YI-
E.212 mobile country code 418	NATO three-letter code IRQ	NATO two-letter code IZ	LOC MARC code IQ
ITU Maritime ID 425	ITU letter code IRQ	FIPS country code IZ	License plate code IRQ
GS1 GTIN prefix —	UNDP country code IRQ	WMO country code IQ	ITU callsign prefixes HNA-HNZ, YIA-YIZ

=== Ireland ===
ISO 3166-1 numeric 372	ISO 3166-1 alpha-3 IRL	ISO 3166-1 alpha-2 IE	ICAO airport code prefix EI
E.164 code 353	IOC country code IRL	Country code top-level domain.ie	ICAO aircraft regis. prefix EI-
E.212 mobile country code 272	NATO three-letter code IRL	NATO two-letter code EI	LOC MARC code IE
ITU Maritime ID 250	ITU letter code IRL	FIPS country code EI	License plate code IRL
GS1 GTIN prefix 539	UNDP country code IRE	WMO country code IE	ITU callsign prefixes EIA-EJZ

=== Isle of Man (British Crown dependency) ===
ISO 3166-1 numeric 833	ISO 3166-1 alpha-3 IMN	ISO 3166-1 alpha-2 IM	ICAO airport code prefix EG
E.164 code 44	IOC country code —	Country code top-level domain.im	ICAO aircraft regis. prefix M-
E.212 mobile country code 234	NATO three-letter code —	NATO two-letter code —	LOC MARC code IM
ITU Maritime ID —	ITU letter code —	FIPS country code IM	License plate code GBM
GS1 GTIN prefix —	UNDP country code IMN	WMO country code —	ITU callsign prefixes —

Other:

- IIGA: IOM

=== Israel ===
ISO 3166-1 numeric 376	ISO 3166-1 alpha-3 ISR	ISO 3166-1 alpha-2 IL	ICAO airport code prefix LL
E.164 code 972	IOC country code ISR	Country code top-level domain.il	ICAO aircraft regis. prefix 4X-
E.212 mobile country code 425	NATO three-letter code ISR	NATO two-letter code IS	LOC MARC code IS
ITU Maritime ID 428	ITU letter code ISR	FIPS country code IS	License plate code IL
GS1 GTIN prefix 729	UNDP country code ISR	WMO country code IS	ITU callsign prefixes 4XA-4XZ, 4ZA,4ZZ

=== Italy ===
ISO 3166-1 numeric 380	ISO 3166-1 alpha-3 ITA	ISO 3166-1 alpha-2 IT	ICAO airport code prefix LI
E.164 code 39	IOC country code ITA	Country code top-level domain.it	ICAO aircraft regis. prefix I-
E.212 mobile country code 222	NATO three-letter code ITA	NATO two-letter code IT	LOC MARC code IT
ITU Maritime ID 247	ITU letter code I	FIPS country code IT	License plate code I
GS1 GTIN prefix 800-839	UNDP country code ITA	WMO country code IY	ITU callsign prefixes IAA-IZZ

=== Ivory Coast ===
ISO 3166-1 numeric 384	ISO 3166-1 alpha-3 CIV	ISO 3166-1 alpha-2 CI	ICAO airport code prefix DI
E.164 code 225	IOC country code CIV	Country code top-level domain.ci	ICAO aircraft regis. prefix TU-
E.212 mobile country code 612	NATO three-letter code CIV	NATO two-letter code IV	LOC MARC code IV
ITU Maritime ID 619	ITU letter code CTI	FIPS country code IV	License plate code CI
GS1 GTIN prefix 618	UNDP country code IVC	WMO country code IV	ITU callsign prefixes TUA-TUZ

== J ==
=== Jamaica ===
ISO 3166-1 numeric 388	ISO 3166-1 alpha-3 JAM	ISO 3166-1 alpha-2 JM	ICAO airport code prefix MK
E.164 code 1	IOC country code JAM	Country code top-level domain.jm	ICAO aircraft regis. prefix 6Y-
E.212 mobile country code 338	NATO three-letter code JAM	NATO two-letter code JM	LOC MARC code JM
ITU Maritime ID 339	ITU letter code JMC	FIPS country code JM	License plate code JA
GS1 GTIN prefix —	UNDP country code JAM	WMO country code JM	ITU callsign prefixes 6YA-6YZ

=== Japan ===
ISO 3166-1 numeric 392	ISO 3166-1 alpha-3 JPN	ISO 3166-1 alpha-2 JP	ICAO airport code prefix RJ, RO
E.164 code 81	IOC country code JPN	Country code top-level domain.jp	ICAO aircraft regis. prefix JA-
E.212 mobile country code 441	NATO three-letter code JPN	NATO two-letter code JA	LOC MARC code JA
ITU Maritime ID 431, 432	ITU letter code J	FIPS country code JA	License plate code J
GS1 GTIN prefix 450-459, 490-499	UNDP country code JPN	WMO country code JP	ITU callsign prefixes 7JA-7NZ,8JA-8NZ,JAA-JSZ

=== Jersey (British Crown dependency) ===
ISO 3166-1 numeric 832	ISO 3166-1 alpha-3 JEY	ISO 3166-1 alpha-2 JE	ICAO airport code prefix EG
E.164 code 44	IOC country code —	Country code top-level domain.je	ICAO aircraft regis. prefix ZJ—
E.212 mobile country code 234	NATO three-letter code —	NATO two-letter code —	LOC MARC code JE
ITU Maritime ID —	ITU letter code —	FIPS country code JE	License plate code GBJ
GS1 GTIN prefix —	UNDP country code —	WMO country code —	ITU callsign prefixes —

Other:

- IIGA: JER

=== Jordan ===
ISO 3166-1 numeric 400	ISO 3166-1 alpha-3 JOR	ISO 3166-1 alpha-2 JO	ICAO airport code prefix OJ
E.164 code 962	IOC country code JOR	Country code top-level domain.jo	ICAO aircraft regis. prefix JY-
E.212 mobile country code 416	NATO three-letter code JOR	NATO two-letter code JO	LOC MARC code JO
ITU Maritime ID 438	ITU letter code JOR	FIPS country code JO	License plate code HKJ
GS1 GTIN prefix 625	UNDP country code JOR	WMO country code JD	ITU callsign prefixes JYA-JYZ

== K ==
=== Kazakhstan ===
ISO 3166-1 numeric 398	ISO 3166-1 alpha-3 KAZ	ISO 3166-1 alpha-2 KZ	ICAO airport code prefix UA
E.164 code 997	IOC country code KAZ	Country code top-level domain.kz	ICAO aircraft regis. prefix UN-
E.212 mobile country code 401	NATO three-letter code KAZ	NATO two-letter code KZ	LOC MARC code KZ
ITU Maritime ID 436	ITU letter code KAZ	FIPS country code KZ	License plate code KZ
GS1 GTIN prefix 487	UNDP country code KAZ	WMO country code KZ	ITU callsign prefixes UNA-UQZ

=== Kenya ===
ISO 3166-1 numeric 404	ISO 3166-1 alpha-3 KEN	ISO 3166-1 alpha-2 KE	ICAO airport code prefix HK
E.164 code 254	IOC country code KEN	Country code top-level domain.ke	ICAO aircraft regis. prefix 5Y-
E.212 mobile country code 639	NATO three-letter code KEN	NATO two-letter code KE	LOC MARC code KE
ITU Maritime ID 634	ITU letter code KEN	FIPS country code KE	License plate code EAK
GS1 GTIN prefix 616	UNDP country code KEN	WMO country code KN	ITU callsign prefixes 5YA-5ZZ

=== Kiribati ===
ISO 3166-1 numeric 296	ISO 3166-1 alpha-3 KIR	ISO 3166-1 alpha-2 KI	ICAO airport code prefix NG
E.164 code 686	IOC country code KIR	Country code top-level domain.ki	ICAO aircraft regis. prefix T3-
E.212 mobile country code 545	NATO three-letter code KIR	NATO two-letter code KR	LOC MARC code GB
ITU Maritime ID 529	ITU letter code KIR	FIPS country code KR	License plate code KIR (unofficial)
GS1 GTIN prefix —	UNDP country code KIR	WMO country code KB	ITU callsign prefixes T3A-T3Z

=== North Korea ===
ISO 3166-1 numeric 408	ISO 3166-1 alpha-3 PRK	ISO 3166-1 alpha-2 KP	ICAO airport code prefix ZK
E.164 code 850	IOC country code PRK	Country code top-level domain.kp	ICAO aircraft regis. prefix P-
E.212 mobile country code 467	NATO three-letter code PRK	NATO two-letter code KN	LOC MARC code KN
ITU Maritime ID 445	ITU letter code KRE	FIPS country code KN	License plate code KP (unofficial)
GS1 GTIN prefix 867	UNDP country code DRK (Note: Democratic [People's] Republic of Korea)	WMO country code KR	ITU callsign prefixes HMA-HMZ, P5A-P9Z

=== South Korea ===
ISO 3166-1 numeric 410	ISO 3166-1 alpha-3 KOR	ISO 3166-1 alpha-2 KR	ICAO airport code prefix RK
E.164 code 82	IOC country code KOR	Country code top-level domain.kr	ICAO aircraft regis. prefix HL-
E.212 mobile country code 450	NATO three-letter code KOR	NATO two-letter code KS	LOC MARC code KO
ITU Maritime ID 440, 441	ITU letter code KOR	FIPS country code KS	License plate code ROK
GS1 GTIN prefix 880	UNDP country code ROK (Note: Republic of Korea)	WMO country code KO	ITU callsign prefixes 6KA-6NZ, D7A-D9Z; DSA-DTZ, HLA-HLZ

=== Kosovo ===
ISO 3166-1 numeric: (Note: For usage by the European Union and other institutions, provisionally 926)	ISO 3166-1 alpha-3: (Note: For usage by the European Union and other institutions, provisionally XKX)	ISO 3166-1 alpha-2: (Note: For usage by the European Union and other institutions, provisionally XK)	ICAO airport code prefix BK
E.164 code 383	IOC country code KOS	Country code top-level domain -	ICAO aircraft regis. prefix Z6
E.212 mobile country code 212	NATO three-letter code -	NATO two-letter code -	LOC MARC code KV
ITU Maritime ID -	ITU letter code -	FIPS country code KV	License plate code RKS
GS1 GTIN prefix -	UNDP country code KOS	WMO country code -	ITU callsign prefixes -

=== Kuwait ===
ISO 3166-1 numeric 414	ISO 3166-1 alpha-3 KWT	ISO 3166-1 alpha-2 KW	ICAO airport code prefix OK
E.164 code 965	IOC country code KUW	Country code top-level domain.kw	ICAO aircraft regis. prefix 9K-
E.212 mobile country code 419	NATO three-letter code KWT	NATO two-letter code KU	LOC MARC code KU
ITU Maritime ID 447	ITU letter code KWT	FIPS country code KU	License plate code KWT
GS1 GTIN prefix 627	UNDP country code KUW	WMO country code KW	ITU callsign prefixes 9KA-9KZ

=== Kyrgyzstan ===
ISO 3166-1 numeric 417	ISO 3166-1 alpha-3 KGZ	ISO 3166-1 alpha-2 KG	ICAO airport code prefix UC
E.164 code 996	IOC country code KGZ	Country code top-level domain.kg	ICAO aircraft regis. prefix EX-
E.212 mobile country code 437	NATO three-letter code KGZ	NATO two-letter code KG	LOC MARC code KG
ITU Maritime ID —	ITU letter code KGZ	FIPS country code KG	License plate code KS
GS1 GTIN prefix 470	UNDP country code KYR	WMO country code KY	ITU callsign prefixes EXA-EXZ
