= BD =

BD, Bd or bd may refer to:

== Arts and entertainment ==
- BD-1, a droid and the main character in the 2019 video game Star Wars Jedi: Fallen Order
- B. D. (Doonesbury), a major character in the Doonesbury comic strip
- Bande dessinée (or "bédé"), a type of French comic strip
- Bass drum, in sheet music notation
- Blue Devils Drum and Bugle Corps, drum and bugle corps
- Brahe Djäknar, a Finnish choir
- Broder Daniel, a Swedish indie pop band
- Ben Drowned, a three-part multimedia alternate reality game (ARG) web serial and web series created by Alexander D. Hall under the pen name Jadusable
- ВD or ВД (Russian: Великий Dракон, romanized: Velikiy Drakon, lit. 'Great Dragon'), 1993–2004 Russian gaming magazine (initially titled Video-Ace Dendy)
- BD Productions, Bette Davis's film production company
- BD Performing Arts, corporate manager of several drum and bugle corps
- Building Design, a British architectural magazine, digital-only since 2014

== Business ==
- Big data, a marketing term for technology of large data sets
- Broker-dealer, a securities trader
- Business day, a date on which business is conducted
- Business development, techniques aimed at attracting customers and penetrating markets
- Business directory, a website or printed listing of information which lists all businesses within some category

== Places and transportation ==
- Bangladesh's ISO 3166-1 country code
- BD postcode area, UK, for Bradford, West Yorkshire, and the surrounding area
- Bermuda's FIPS PUB 10-4 territory code and obsolete NATO country code — see List of country codes: A–K § Bermuda
- Brunei Darussalam's World Meteorological Organization country code — see List of country codes: A–K § Brunei
- Burundi's LOC MARC code — see List of country codes: A–K § Burundi
- Bengkulu, in vehicle registration plates of Indonesia
- Bandung railway station, West Java, Indonesia (station code BD)
- Badnera Junction railway station, Maharashtra, India (station code BD)
- Bloor-Danforth, a subway line in Toronto, Canada
- BMI (airline), or British Midland Airways (IATA airline code BD until 2012)
- Cambodia Bayon Airlines (IATA airline code BD from 2014)

== Science and technology ==
=== Computing ===
- Baud (Bd), the natural unit of symbol rate
- Big data, data sets that are so large or complex that traditional data processing applications are inadequate
- Blu-ray Disc, a high density blue laser optical disc format, or the successor of DVD
  - BD+, a component of the Blu-ray Disc Digital Rights Management system
- .bd, the country top-level domain for Bangladesh

=== Biology and medicine ===
- Batrachochytrium dendrobatidis, a fungus that causes the fatal amphibian disease chytridiomycosis
- BD butterfly, Callicore cynosura
- Bipolar disorder, a mood disorder
- Latin: bis in die, lit. 'twice daily', an indication that a medication needs to be taken twice a day
- BD (company), short for Becton, Dickinson and Company, an American multinational manufacturer of medical supplies

=== Other uses in science and technology ===
- Bonner Durchmusterung, a 19th-century star catalog, published by the Bonn Observatory in Germany
- B&D Australia, an Australian manufacturing company

== Sex ==
- Bad Dragon, an American manufacturer of fantasy-themed sex toys
- Bondage and discipline in BDSM

== Politics and violence ==
- Bündnis Deutschland, a minor German political party
- Bajrang Dal, an Indian Hindutva militant organization
- Battle Dress, a British military uniform
- Black Disciples, a black street gang based in Chicago, United States

== Other uses ==
- Bachelor of Divinity or Baccalaureate in Divinity, an academic degree for theology, religious studies, or similar
