= List of NATO country codes =

This is a list of heritage NATO country codes. Up to and including the seventh edition of STANAG 1059, these were two-letter codes (digrams). The eighth edition, promulgated 19 February 2004, and effective 1 April 2004, replaced all codes with new ones based on the ISO 3166-1 alpha-2 codes. Additional codes cover gaps in the ISO coverage, deal with imaginary countries used for exercise purposes, and designate large geographical groupings and water bodies (ranging from oceans to rivers). It consists of two-letter codes for geographical entities, four-letter codes for subdivisions, and lists the ISO three-letter codes for reference. The digrams match the FIPS 10-4 codes with a few exceptions.

The ninth edition's ratification draft was published on 6 July 2005, with a reply deadline of 6 October 2005. It replaces all two- and four-letter codes with ISO or ISO-like three- and six-letter codes. It is intended as a transitional standard: once all NATO nations have updated their information systems, a tenth edition will be published.

For diplomatic reasons, the country that is now known as North Macedonia was designated as the Former Yugoslav Republic of Macedonia for a number of years and received a temporary code, FY/FYR, explicitly different from the ISO one, which was 3166 MKD. Since its name change following the 2018 Prespa agreement with Greece, the country is identified with the MK digram and the MKD trigram, but on car license plates, they must be changed to NM or NMK.

The Republic of Palau is also often indicated (at least in the United States) as PW.

Digram	Trigram	Entity	Comment
AA	ABW	Aruba	
AB	ABB	Asia	9th ed. adds the trigram, not in ISO 3166-1
AC	ATG	Antigua and Barbuda	
AF	AFG	Afghanistan	
AG	DZA	Algeria	
AJ	AZE	Azerbaijan	
SS	SSD	South Sudan	
AL	ALB	Albania	
AM	ARM	Armenia	
AN	AND	Andorra	
AO	AGO	Angola	
AR	ARG	Argentina	
AU	AUS	Australia	
NA	ACI	Ashmore and Cartier Islands	Appears with 9th ed.; the entity is omitted from 8th ed., not in ISO 3166-1
AT	AUT	Austria	
AV	AIA	Anguilla	
AY	ATA	Antarctica	
BA	BHR	Bahrain	
BB	BRB	Barbados	
BC	BWA	Botswana	
BM	BMU	Bermuda	
BE	BEL	Belgium	
BF	BHS	The Bahamas	
BD	BGD	Bangladesh	
BH	BLZ	Belize	
BK	BIH	Bosnia-Herzegovina	
BL	BOL	Bolivia	
MM	MMR	Myanmar	
BN	BEN	Benin	
BO	BLR	Belarus	
BP	SLB	Solomon Islands	
BR	BRA	Brazil	
BT	BTN	Bhutan	
BG	BGR	Bulgaria	
BV	BVT	Bouvet Island	
BX	BRN	Brunei	
BY	BDI	Burundi	
CA	CAN	Canada	
CB	KHM	Cambodia	
CD	TCD	Chad	
CE	LKA	Sri Lanka	
CF	COG	Republic of the Congo	
CD	COD	Democratic Republic of the Congo	
CH	CHN	People's Republic of China	
CI	CHL	Chile	
CJ	CYM	Cayman Islands	
CK	CCK	Cocos (Keeling) Islands	
CM	CMR	Cameroon	
CN	COM	Comoros	
CO	COL	Colombia	
CQ	MNP	Northern Mariana Islands	Also listed under the subdivision code US-MP-
CR	CSI	Coral Sea Islands	Appears with 9th ed.; the entity is omitted from 8th ed., not in ISO 3166-1
CS	CRI	Costa Rica	
CT	CAF	Central African Republic	
CU	CUB	Cuba	
CV	CPV	Cape Verde	
CW	COK	Cook Islands	
CY	CYP	Cyprus	
CZ	CZE	Czech Republic	
DA	DNK	Denmark	
DJ	DJI	Djibouti	
DO	DMA	Dominica	
DR	DOM	Dominican Republic	
EC	ECU	Ecuador	
EE	EEE	Europe	9th ed. adds the trigram, not in ISO 3166-1
EG	EGY	Egypt	
EI	IRL	Ireland	
EK	GNQ	Equatorial Guinea	
EN	EST	Estonia	
ER	ERI	Eritrea	
ES	ESP	Spain	
ET	ETH	Ethiopia	
FF	FFF	Africa	9th ed. adds the trigram, not in ISO 3166-1
FG	GUF	French Guiana	9th ed. lists it under France as FR-973
FI	FIN	Finland	
FJ	FJI	Fiji	
FK	FLK	Falkland Islands	
FM	FSM	Federated States of Micronesia	
FO	FRO	Faroe Islands	
FP	PYF	French Polynesia	9th ed. lists it under France as FR-PYF
FR	FRA	France	
FS	ATF	French Southern Territories	9th ed. lists it under France as FR-FST
GM	GMB	The Gambia	8th ed. STANAG 1049 revised from GA (now: Gabon)
GA	GAB	Gabon	8th ed. STANAG 1049 revised from GB (now: United Kingdom)
GC	n/a	East Germany	Obsolete 1990
DE	DEU	Germany	
GG	GEO	Georgia	
GH	GHA	Ghana	
GI	GIB	Gibraltar	
GJ	GRD	Grenada	
GL	GRL	Greenland	
GP	GLP	Guadeloupe	9th ed. lists it under France as FR-971
GQ	GUM	Guam	Also listed under the subdivision code US-GU-
GR	GRC	Greece	
GT	GTM	Guatemala	
GV	GIN	Guinea	
GY	GUY	Guyana	
HA	HTI	Haiti	
HK	HKG	Hong Kong	Also listed under the provincial code CN-91-
HM	HMD	Heard Island and McDonald Islands	
HO	HND	Honduras	
HQ	HQI	Howland Island	Appears with 9th ed.; also listed under IQ, not in ISO 3166-1
HR	HRV	Croatia	
HU	HUN	Hungary	
IC	ISL	Iceland	
ID	IDN	Indonesia	
IN	IND	India	
IO	IOT	British Indian Ocean Territory	
IQ	UMI	U.S. Minor Outlying Islands	Baker, Howland, Jarvis, Johnston, Kingman Reef, Midway, Navassa, Palmyra, and Wake Islands; Also listed under the subdivision code US-UM-
IR	IRN	Iran	
IS	ISR	Israel	
IT	ITA	Italy	
IV	CIV	Côte d'Ivoire	
IZ	IRQ	Iraq	
JA	JPN	Japan	
JM	JAM	Jamaica	
JN	JNM	Jan Mayen Island	Appears with 9th ed.; also listed under SV/SJM; Also listed under the subdivision code NO-22-
JO	JOR	Jordan	
JQ	JQA	Johnston Atoll	Appears with 9th ed.; also listed under IQ, not in ISO 3166-1
KE	KEN	Kenya	
KG	KGZ	Kyrgyzstan	
KN	PRK	Democratic People's Republic of Korea	
KR	KIR	Kiribati	
KS	KOR	Republic of Korea	
KT	CXR	Christmas Island	
KU	KWT	Kuwait	
KZ	KAZ	Kazakhstan	
LA	LAO	Laos	
LE	LBN	Lebanon	
LG	LVA	Latvia	
LH	LTU	Lithuania	
LI	LBR	Liberia	
LO	SVK	Slovakia	
LS	LIE	Liechtenstein	
LT	LSO	Lesotho	
LU	LUX	Luxembourg	
LY	LBY	Libya	
MA	MDG	Madagascar	
MB	MTQ	Martinique	9th ed. lists it under France as FR-972
MC	MAC	Macau	
MD	MDA	Republic of Moldova	
ME	MNE	Montenegro	Since 8th ed.
MG	MNG	Mongolia	
MH	MSR	Montserrat	
MI	MWI	Malawi	
MK	MKD	North Macedonia	While the country had the provisional name of the Former Yugoslav Republic of Macedonia, the digram was FY and the trigram, FYR.
ML	MLI	Mali	MLI in ISO 3166-1
MN	MCO	Monaco	
MO	MAR	Morocco	
MP	MUS	Mauritius	
MR	MRT	Mauritania	
MT	MLT	Malta	
MU	OMN	Oman	
MV	MDV	The Maldives	
MX	MEX	Mexico	
MY	MYS	Malaysia	
MZ	MOZ	Mozambique	
NA	ANT	Netherlands Antilles	removed from ISO 3166-1
NC	NCL	New Caledonia	9th ed. lists it under France as FR-NCL
NU	NIU	Niue	
NF	NFK	Norfolk Island	
NE	NER	Niger	
NH	VUT	Vanuatu	
NG	NGA	Nigeria	
NL	NLD	Netherlands	
NN	NNN	North America	9th ed. adds the trigram, not in ISO 3166-1
NO	NOR	Norway	
NP	NPL	Nepal	
NR	NRU	Nauru	
NS	SUR	Suriname	
NT	NTT	NATO countries	9th ed. adds the trigram, not in ISO 3166-1
NU	NIC	Nicaragua	
NZ	NZL	New Zealand	
PA	PRY	Paraguay	
PN	PCN	Pitcairn Islands	
PE	PER	Peru	
PF	PFI	Paracel Islands	Appears with 9th ed.; the entity is omitted from 8th ed., not in ISO 3166-1
PK	PAK	Pakistan	
PL	POL	Poland	
PM	PAN	Panama	
PT	PRT	Portugal	
PP	PNG	Papua New Guinea	
PS	PLW	Palau	In 9th ed., the digram is also assigned to Palestine
PS	PSE	Palestinian Territory	Temporary code; 8th ed. has no digram for Palestine; 9th ed. also assigns PS to Palau
PU	GNB	Guinea-Bissau	
QA	QAT	Qatar	
RE	REU	Réunion	9th ed. lists it under France as FR-974
RM	MHL	Marshall Islands	8th ed. omits the trigram (mistakenly?)
RO	ROU	Romania	
RP	PHL	Philippines	
RQ	PRI	Puerto Rico	Also listed under the subdivision code US-PR-
RS	SRB	Serbia	8th ed.
RU	RUS	Russia	Original code RS is not to be used 8th ed. Now assigned to Serbia.
RW	RWA	Rwanda	
SA	SAU	Saudi Arabia	
SB	SPM	Saint Pierre and Miquelon	9th ed. lists it under France as FR-975 and assigns SB to "Serbia and Montenegro"
SC	KNA	Saint Kitts and Nevis	
SE	SYC	Seychelles	
SF	ZAF	South Africa	
SG	SEN	Senegal	
SH	SHN	Saint Helena	
SI	SVN	Slovenia	
SJ	SJM	Svalbard and Jan Mayen Islands	Also listed under the subdivision code NO-21-
SL	SLE	Sierra Leone	
SM	SMR	San Marino	
SN	SGP	Singapore	
SO	SOM	Somalia	
SR	SRR	South America	9th ed. adds the trigram, not in ISO 3166-1
SS	ASM	American Samoa	Also listed under the subdivision code US-AS-
SS	WSM	Samoa	Some sources (other than the STANAGs themselves) claim the digram was WS
ST	LCA	Saint Lucia	
SU	SDN	Sudan	
SV	SLV	El Salvador	
SW	SWE	Sweden	
SX	SGS	South Georgia and South Sandwich Islands	
SY	SYR	Syria	
SZ	CHE	Switzerland	
TC	ARE	United Arab Emirates	
TD	TTO	Trinidad and Tobago	
TH	THA	Thailand	
TI	TJK	Tajikistan	
TK	TCA	Turks and Caicos Islands	
TK	TKL	Tokelau	
TL	TLS	Timor-Leste	
TN	TON	Tonga	
TO	TGO	Togo	
TP	STP	São Tomé and Príncipe	
TS	TUN	Tunisia	
TU	TUR	Turkey	
TV	TUV	Tuvalu	
TW	TWN	Republic of China (Taiwan)	Also listed under the provincial code CN-71-
TX	TKM	Turkmenistan	
TZ	TZA	Tanzania	
UG	UGA	Uganda	
GB	GBR	United Kingdom (Great Britain and Northern Ireland)	8th ed. STANAG 1059 removed UK
UA	UKR	Ukraine	
UR	n/a	Union of Soviet Socialist Republics	Obsolete 1992
US	USA	United States	
UU	UUU	Oceania	9th ed. adds the trigram, not in ISO 3166-1
UV	BFA	Burkina Faso	
UY	URY	Uruguay	
UZ	UZB	Uzbekistan	
VC	VCT	Saint Vincent and the Grenadines	
VE	VEN	Venezuela	
VI	VIR	U.S. Virgin Islands	8th ed. lists "VI or VS"; Also listed under the subdivision code US-VI-
VN	VNM	Vietnam	
VS	VGB	British Virgin Islands	8th ed. lists "VI or VS"
VT	VAT	Vatican City (Holy See)	
WA	NAM	Namibia	
WF	WLF	Wallis and Futuna Islands	9th ed. lists it under France as FR-WLF
WI	ESH	Western Sahara	
WZ	SWZ	Swaziland	
XB	XXB	"Brownland"	9th ed. adds the trigram, private use in ISO 3166-1
XE	XXE	SHAPE (ACO Command)	9th ed. adds the trigram, private use in ISO 3166-1
XG	XXG	"Greyland"	9th ed. adds the trigram, private use in ISO 3166-1
XI	XXI	"Indigoland"	9th ed. adds the trigram, private use in ISO 3166-1
XL	XXL	"Limeland"	9th ed. adds the trigram, private use in ISO 3166-1
XM	XXM	NATO	private use in ISO 3166-1
XN	XXN	NATO "Blue" Command	9th ed. adds the trigram, private use in ISO 3166-1
XP	XXP	"Purpleland"	9th ed. adds the trigram, private use in ISO 3166-1
XR	XXR	"Redland"	9th ed. adds the trigram, private use in ISO 3166-1
XS	XXS	SACLANT (HQ SACT Command)	9th ed. adds the trigram, private use in ISO 3166-1
XW	XXW	"Whiteland"	9th ed. adds the trigram, private use in ISO 3166-1
XY	XXY	"Yellowland"	9th ed. adds the trigram, private use in ISO 3166-1
YE	YEM	Yemen	
YO	n/a	Yugoslavia	Obsolete 1993
YT	-	Mayotte	Former NATO code ME is not to be used since 8th ed.; 8th ed. omits the trigram (mistakenly?); 9th ed. lists it under France as FR-976
—	SCG	Serbia and Montenegro	9th ed. lists SB for the digram, which 8th ed. assigns to Saint Pierre and Miquelon, removed from ISO 3166-1
YU	YUG	Yugoslavia (Federal Republic of)	
ZA	ZMB	Zambia	
ZI	ZWE	Zimbabwe	

Water Bodies (9th edition)
Trigram	Digram	Entity	Comment
1A-	1A	North Atlantic Ocean	
1B-	1B	Bay of Biscay	
1C-	1C	Bristol Channel	
1D-	1D	Denmark Strait	
1E-	1E	English Channel	
1F-	1F	Bay of Fundy	
1G-	1G	Gulf of Guinea	
1H-	1H	Hudson Bay	
1I-	1I	Lake Volta	
1J-	1J	Panama Canal	
1K-	1K	Inner Seas	Inner Seas off the West Coast of Scotland, a.k.a. Inner Scottish Sea, including the Minch, the Sea of the Hebrides, and stretching to Ireland
1L-	1L	Labrador Sea	
1M-	1M	Gulf of Mexico	
1N-	1N	North Sea	
1O-	1O	Niger River	
1P-	1P	Baffin Bay	
1Q-	1Q	St. George's Channel	
1R-	1R	Irish Sea	
1S-	1S	Skagerrak	
1T-	1T	Gulf of St. Lawrence	
1U-	1U	Hudson Strait	
1V-	1V	Davis Strait	
1W-	1W	Magdalena River	
1X-	1X	Caribbean Sea	
1Y-	1Y	Gulf of Cadiz	
1Z-	1Z	Cantabrian Sea	
2A-	2A	South Atlantic Ocean	
2B-	2B	Amazon River	
2C-	2C	Congo River	
2D-	2D	Drake Passage	
2E-	2E	Gulf of Campecha	Gulf of Campeche (typo)
2F-	2F	Gulf of Fonseca	
2G-	2G	Lake Granada	Lake Nicaragua
2H-	2H	Gulf of Honduras	
2I-	2I	Río de la Plata Bay	
2J-	2J	Gulf of San Gorge	Golfo San Jorge (typo)
2K-	2K	Sargasso Sea	
2L-	2L	Magellan Strait	
2M-	2M	Gulf of San Matias	San Matias Gulf
2P-	2P	Putymayo River	Putumayo River (typo)
2Q-	2Q	Orinoco River	
2R-	2R	Río de la Plata	
2S-	2S	Scotia Sea	
2W-	2W	Weddell Sea	
2X-	2X	La Pérouse Strait	
2Y-	2Y	Salomon Sea	Solomon Sea (typo)
2Z-	2Z	Yucátan Sea	
31-	31	Tonle Sap	
32-	32	Song Hua Giang	Bassac (Hua Giang) River
33-	33	Chhâk Kâmpóng Saôm	Kompong Som Bay, Cambodia †
34-	34	Chhâk Veal Renh	Veal Renh Bay, Cambodia †
35-	35	Chhâk Kaôh Kŏng	Kaôh Kŏng Bay, Cambodia
36-	36	Huang Pu (Yellow River)	
37-	37	Yangtze River	
38-	38	Hang Chou Wan	Kwang-Chou-Wan
39-	39	Sunda Strait	
3A-	3A	North Pacific	
3B-	3B	Sakhalinskiy Zaliv	Sakhalin Gulf/Bay/Bight
3C-	3C	Celebes Sea	
3D-	3D	Tatar Strait	
3E-	3E	East China Sea	
3F-	3F	Formosa Strait	
3G-	3G	Gulf of Tonkin	
3H-	3H	Halmahera Sea	
3I-	3I	Luzon Strait	
3J-	3J	Sea of Japan	
3K-	3K	Zaliv Shelikhova	Shelikhova Gulf
3L-	3L	Gulf of California	
3M-	3M	Molucca Sea	
3N-	3N	Inland Sea	
3O-	3O	Amur River	
3P-	3P	Philippine Sea	
3Q-	3Q	Sea of Okhotsk	
3R-	3R	Korea Bay	
3S-	3S	Sulu Sea	
3T-	3T	Gulf of Thailand	
3U-	3U	South China Sea	
3V-	3V	Teluk Tomini	Gulf of Tomini
3W-	3W	Mekong River	
3X-	3X	Bo Hai	
3Y-	3Y	Yellow Sea	
3Z-	3Z	Singapore Strait	
4A-	4A	South Pacific Ocean	
4B-	4B	Banda Sea	
4C-	4C	Coral Sea	
4D-	4D	Amundsen Sea	
4E-	4E	Teluk Bone	Gulf of Bone/Boni
4F-	4F	Flores Sea	
4G-	4G	Bellingshausen Sea	
4I-	4I	Lake Titicaca	
4J-	4J	Java Sea	
4K-	4K	Bismarck Sea	
4L-	4L	Bali Sea	
4M-	4M	Makassar Strait	
4N-	4N	Napo River	
4O-	4O	Pacific Ocean	
4P-	4P	Gulf of Carpentaria	
4Q-	4Q	Ceram Sea	
4R-	4R	Ross Sea	
4S-	4S	Solomon Sea	
4T-	4T	Tasman Sea	
4U-	4U	Arafura Sea	
4Z-	4Z	Antarctic Ocean	
5A-	5A	Arctic Ocean	
5B-	5B	Barents Sea	
5C-	5C	Chukshi Sea	Chukchi Sea
5D-	5D	Bering Sea	
5E-	5E	Alaska/BC Coastal Waters	
5F-	5F	Gulf of Alaska	
5G-	5G	Greenland Sea	
5K-	5K	Kara Sea	
5L-	5L	Lincoln Sea	
5N-	5N	Norwegian Sea	
5P-	5P	Laptev Sea	
5R-	5R	Bering Strait	
5S-	5S	East Siberian Sea	
5T-	5T	Northwest Passage	
5U-	5U	Beaufort Sea	
5W-	5W	White Sea	
5Y-	5Y	Anadyrskiy Zaliv	Anadyrskiy Gulf
62-	62	Strait of Hormuz	
6A-	6A	Indian Ocean	
6B-	6B	Bay of Bengal	
6C-	6C	Strait of Malacca	
6D-	6D	Gulf of Aden	
6E-	6E	Red Sea	
6F-	6F	Bass Strait	
6G-	6G	Great Australian Bight	
6H-	6H	Gulf of Mannar	
6I-	6I	Lake Malawi	
6J-	6J	Ussuri River	
6K-	6K	Zambezi River	
6L-	6L	Laccadive Sea	
6M-	6M	Gulf of Oman	
6N-	6N	Andaman Sea	
6O-	6O	Limpopo River	
6P-	6P	Persian Gulf	
6Q-	6Q	Gulf of Aqaba	
6R-	6R	Arabian Sea	
6S-	6S	Savu Sea	
6T-	6T	Timor Sea	
6U-	6U	Suez Canal	
6V-	6V	Lake Victoria	
6W-	6W	Gulf of Suez	
6X-	6X	Lake Nyasa	
6Y-	6Y	Lake Tanganyika	
6Z-	6Z	Mozambique Channel	
7B-	7B	Baltic Sea	
7E-	7E	German Bight	
7F-	7F	Gulf of Finland	
7G-	7G	Gdansk Bay	
7H-	7H	Gulf of Riga	
7K-	7K	Kattegat	
7L-	7L	Leba River	
7M-	7M	Baltic Approaches	
7P-	7P	Pomeranian Bay	
7T-	7T	Gulf of Bothnia	
81-	81	Gulf of Sirte	
82-	82	Naama Bay	Sharm el-Sheikh's Naama Bay??
83-	83	Gulf of Hammamet	
84-	84	Gulf of Sollum	Khalîg el Salûm
89-	89	Mediterranean Sea	
8A-	8A	Danube River	
8B-	8B	Black Sea	
8C-	8C	Caspian Sea	
8D-	8D	Adriatic Sea	
8E-	8E	Mediterranean, Eastern	
8F-	8F	Durrës Bay	Bay of Durrës, Albania
8G-	8G	Agean Sea	Aegean Sea (typo)
8H-	8H	Mediterranean, Central	
8I-	8I	Lake Tiberias	
8J-	8J	Balearic Sea	
8K-	8K	Kotor Bay	
8L-	8L	Ligurian Sea	
8M-	8M	Sea of Marmara	
8N-	8N	Ionian Sea	
8O-	8O	Lake Ohrid	
8P-	8P	Istanbul Strait	Bosphorus
8Q-	8Q	Lake Scutari	
8R-	8R	Aral Sea	
8S-	8S	Strait of Gibraltar	
8T-	8T	Tyrrhenian Sea	
8U-	8U	Çanakkale Strait	Dardanelles
8V-	8V	Vlorë Bay	Bay of Vlorë, Albania
8W-	8W	Mediterranean, Western	
8X-	8X	Gulf of Lion	
8Y-	8Y	Alboran Sea	
8Z-	8Z	Sea of Azov	
9A-	9A	Atlantic Ocean	
9E-	9E	Lake Erie	
9H-	9H	Lake Huron	
9L-	9L	St. Lawrence Seaway	
9M-	9M	Lake Michigan	
9N-	9N	Lake Ontario	
9S-	9S	Lake Superior	
9W-	9W	Lake Winnipeg	
9Z-	9Z	Great Lakes	
IW-	IW	International Waters	

== Sources ==
- NATO STANAG 1059 INT (Ed. 7, 2000) Distinguishing Letters for Geographical Entities for Use in NATO
- NATO STANAG 1059 INT (Ed. 8, 2003) Letter Codes for Geographical Entities
- NATO STANAG 1059 INT (Ed. 9 Ratification Draft, 2005) Codes for Geographical Entities
- ISO Online Browsing Platform

== See also ==
- Country code top-level domain
