= Comparison of VoIP software =

Voice over IP software comparison

This is a comparison of voice over IP (VoIP) software that examines applications and systems used for conducting voice and multimedia communications across Internet Protocol (IP) networks. VoIP technology has transformed telecommunications by offering alternatives to traditional telephony systems while providing enhanced features and cost savings.

For residential users, VoIP services typically provide significant cost advantages compared to traditional public switched telephone network (PSTN) services. These systems eliminate geographic restrictions on phone numbers, enabling users to maintain local numbers in any area code regardless of their physical location. For example, a user can operate a New York phone number while residing in Tokyo, facilitating global mobility and reducing international communication costs.

In enterprise environments, VoIP technology enables the consolidation of voice and data networks into a unified IP infrastructure. This consolidation eliminates the need for separate voice and data pipelines while providing advanced capabilities including:

- Unified communications integration
- Presence management systems
- Advanced call routing
- Mobile device integration
- Multimedia conferencing capabilities

Softphone applications serve as the primary client-side implementation of VoIP technology. These applications transform standard computing devices into full-featured communication endpoints, supporting voice and video calls over IP networks while providing standard telephony functions. Most softphone clients utilize the Session Initiation Protocol (SIP), an open standard that supports various audio and video codecs. Some systems, like Skype, operate on proprietary protocols but can integrate with SIP-based systems through specialized business telephone system (PBX) software.

The VoIP ecosystem encompasses various specialized applications beyond basic communication endpoints:

== Core components ==
- Conferencing servers for large-scale virtual meetings
- Intercom systems for internal communications
- Virtual foreign exchange services (FXOs)
- Hybrid systems supporting both VoIP and PSTN integration

== Specialized applications ==
- Interactive Voice Response (IVR) systems
- Automated dictation platforms
- Professional call recording solutions
- Custom hold music and messaging systems

VoIP implementations generally fall into two categories:

- Web-based solutions that operate through browsers, offering simplified deployment and platform independence
- Standalone desktop applications that provide enhanced features, superior reliability, and advanced feature sets

== Desktop applications ==
Program	Operating systems	License	Costs	Protocols	Codecs	Encryption	Max conference peers	Other abilities	Latest release
Blink	Linux, macOS, Windows	Mixed: free software versions under GNU GPLv3 + shareware versions under gplv3 with exception of including proprietary code	macOS version proprietary on App Store, free version limited to sponsored SIP provider; Windows version proprietary; Linux version open source	ICE, SIP, MSRP, RFB (VNC), XCAP	Opus, speex, G.722, GSM, iLBC, PCMU, PCMA	TLS, SRTP and ZRTP on all versions, OTR/SMP on Linux and macOS only	No limit	IM, file transfer, desktop sharing, multi-party conference, wideband	Blink Qt
Battle.net	macOS, Android, iOS, Windows	Proprietary	Free	Unknown	Unknown	Unknown	Unknown	IM, multi-party conference	Unknown
Discord	macOS, Android, iOS, Windows, Linux	Proprietary	Free, Premium "Nitro" Subscription for Additional Features.	RTP, UDP, WS, HTTPS	Opus	TLS	5000 soft limit for voice calls, 25 hard limit for video	IM, file sharing, desktop sharing, in-game overlay	10.0.19045; December 19, 2024; 22 months ago
Eyeball Chat	Windows	Proprietary	Free	SIP, STUN, ICE, XMPP	Unknown	Yes	5	IM, Conferencing, Voice, Video and SIMPLE based presence	Windows 3.2; 2009; 17 years ago
FaceTime	iOS, macOS	Proprietary	Free	SIP, IETF, Signaling protocol for VoIP, STUN, TURN and ICE| IETF, technologies for traversing firewalls and NAT	H.264 Video, AAC-ELD Audio, H.263 and VP8	RTP, SRTP IETF|standards for delivering real-time and encrypted media streams for VoIP.	20	Video, voice, conferencing, with additional tools available as "Services".	
Fluxer	Linux, macOS, Windows, Android, iOS	AGPLv3	Free, premium "Plutonium" subscription for additional features (only required on the official instance).		H.264, VP9, VP8, AV1, H.265	TLS	20	IM, file sharing, desktop sharing	2026.920.144558; September 20, 2026; 51 days ago
IBM Sametime	Linux, macOS, Windows, mobile	Proprietary	?	SIP-SIMPLE, T.120	H.323	TLS	Unknown	IM, File transfer, Voice, Presence, Server stored contact list, HTTP tunneling, plugins, embeddable in Lotus Notes	8.5.2; May 8, 2011; 15 years ago
Jami	Android, FreeBSD, iOS, iPhone, Linux, Microsoft Windows, OS X	GPL-3.0-or-later	Free	SIP, RTP, STUN per account, SRV, DHT, P2P	Audio: Opus, Speex, G.722, G.711, GSM, VP8, G.729, iLBC. Video: H.264, H.263, VP8, MPEG-4	Voice encryption (SRTP with SDES or ZRTP) and signaling encryption (TLS), multiple realms authentication mechanism	No limit	Blockchain ID-management, Qt client, address book, multiple accounts, unlimited call number, call transfer, call hold-resume, call recording, multi-way conferencing	App Store: 4.00 / October 22, 2025; 12 months ago; Chocolatey: 2025.10.1 / October 1, 2025; 13 months ago; F-Droid: 20251114-01 / November 14, 2025; 11 months ago; Flathub: 20251106.0 / November 6, 2025; 12 months ago; GNU/Linux: 20251116 / November 16, 2025; 11 months ago; Google Play: 20251117-01 / November 17, 2025; 11 months ago; Homebrew: 2.37 / November 22, 2025; 11 months ago; macOS: 2.37 / November 22, 2025; 11 months ago; Snap Store: 20251106 / November 6, 2025; 12 months ago; Windows: 20251001 / October 1, 2025; 13 months ago
Jitsi	Linux, macOS, Windows (all java supported). Experimental Android builds are also available.	Apache-2.0	Free	SIP-SIMPLE, XMPP-Jingle STUN ICE, TURN	SILK, G.722, Speex, Opus, G.711 (PCMU/PCMA), iLBC, GSM, G.729, H.264, H.263, VP8	ZRTP, SRTP, OTR, TLS	Unknown	Text messaging, audio-video telephony, IPv6 (often broken, P2P not supported), call recording, 64-bit	2.10 (build.5550) (February 5, 2017; 9 years ago) [±]
Linphone	Linux, Windows, macOS, Android, iPhone, BlackBerry	GPL-3.0-or-later	Free	SIP	Speex, Opus, G711, GSM, G.722, VP8 (WebM), H263, MPEG4, Theora and H264 (plugin)	TLS, SRTP, ZRTP	Unknown	Video, IM, STUN, IPv6 (disables IPv4 support when enabled), P2P, Secure Encryption, User own Encryption via Provided API https://gitlab.linphone.org/BC/public/linphone-desktop	4.2.5; June 25, 2020; 6 years ago, provides daily snapshots via http://www.linphone.org/snapshots
Messages	macOS	Proprietary	Free, only macOS and iOS	SIP AIM ICQ XMPP	H263, H264	Unknown	Unknown	Integrated, PBX independent	7.0; July 25, 2012; 14 years ago
Movim	Any, Progressive web application	GPL-2.0-or-later	Free	XMPP, STUN, TURN	Depending the web-browser	TLS	2	IM, microblogging, social-network, OMEMO encryption, screen-sharing, file transfer	2026-11-04
Mumble	Linux, macOS, iOS, Windows, Android	BSD-3-Clause	Free	ICE	CELT, Speex, Opus	TLS and OCB-AES128	No limit (limited only by server bandwidth and memory)	Chat with (limited) embedded HTML, Automatic Gain Control, very low latency, Access Control Lists for user management, Customizable In-Game Overlay for OpenGL and DirectX, Directional Audio, Plugin Support, Nested Channels, Echo cancellation for headset free use, Global Public Server List, Logitech G15 support, Push-To-Talk and Voice-Activation	1.4.287; September 14, 2022; 4 years ago
Nymgo	Windows, Android, iOS	Proprietary	Free	SIP, RTP and RTCP	Unknown	Yes	No limit	Address Book integration, Call recording/export, Mute, On Hold, Caller ID definition	4.2.9; March 2013; 13 years ago
Phoner	Windows	Proprietary	Free	SIP, TAPI, CAPI	G.711a, G.711u, G.722, G.726, G.729, GSM, iLBC, speex, Opus	TLS, SRTP, ZRTP	8	Conferencing, call redirection, call recording	3.23 (5 March 2021; 5 years ago) [±]
PhonerLite	Windows	Proprietary	Free	SIP	G.711a, G.711u, G.722, G.726, G.729, GSM, iLBC, speex, Opus	TLS, SRTP, ZRTP	8	Conferencing, call redirection, call recording	3.38 (30 March 2026; 7 months ago) [±]
Roger Wilco GameSpy	Windows	Proprietary	?	Proprietary	MELP	No	Unknown	?	1999; 27 years ago
Signal	Linux, macOS, Windows, Android, iPhone	GPLv3 clients and AGPLv3 server	Free	RingRTC (WebRTC over Signal protocol)	Opus	TLS, Signal Protocol	50	Signal also allows users to send text messages, files, voice notes, pictures, GIFs, and video messages over a Wi-Fi or data connection to other Signal users on iOS, Android and a desktop app. The app also supports group messaging, read receipts and typing indicators, both of which can be disabled.	Android: 8.31.2 / 13 October 2026; iOS: 8.33 / 20 October 2026; Desktop: 8.32.0 / 20 October 2026
Skype	Linux(with limited functionality), macOS, Windows 2000-XP-Vista-7-Mobile (unsupported), BREW, Windows Phone, Android, iPhone, PSP	Proprietary	Free	Proprietary P2P protocol (Note: It is possible to connect by SIP to the Skype network via additional "Skype Connect" PBX software and alternative (SIP) client software/hardware. Neither the Skype software nor the Skype network supports SIP directly)	SILK	TLS	25 starting with version 3.6.0.216. 10 with 2.x	Conferencing, video, file transfer, voicemail, Skype to phone, phone to Skype, additional P2P extensions (games, whiteboard, etc...); depending on platform.	Windows, UWP, discontinued: 15.150.3125.0 / 5 May 2025; 18 months ago; Windows, desktop, discontinued: 8.150.0.125 / 5 May 2025; 18 months ago; macOS, discontinued: 8.150.0.125 / 5 May 2025; 18 months ago; Linux, discontinued: 8.150.0.125 / 5 May 2025; 18 months ago; Android, discontinued: 8.150.0.125 / 5 May 2025; 18 months ago; iOS, discontinued: 8.150.0.125 / 5 May 2025; 18 months ago
Steam Chat	Web, Phones, Desktop	Proprietary		WebRTC					
TeamSpeak	Linux, Windows, macOS, FreeBSD, Android, iOS	Proprietary	Free	Unknown	CELT, Speex (both until server version 3.5.0), Opus	Yes	32 unlicensed, 512 with Non-Profit License (available until September 2018), up to 1024 (Gamer License), 2000	Simultaneous server conferencing with tabs, 3D sound effects, scalable permissions system, firewall friendly file transfers, in-game overlay for DirectX & OpenGL games, global public server list, plugin system, IM.	6.0.0-beta3.4; December 11, 2025; 10 months ago
TeamTalk	Linux, Windows, macOS, Android, iOS, Raspbian	Proprietary	Free	Proprietary	Opus, Speex, VP8	No	1000	Video, file sharing, desktop sharing, stream media files (MP3, AVI)	5.3.3; November 2018; 8 years ago
TeamViewer	Linux, Windows, macOS, iOS, Android	Proprietary	Free (personal use only)	Unknown	Unknown	AES256	Unknown	Unknown	Windows: 15.80.4 / July 28, 2026; 3 months ago; macOS: 15.80.4 / July 28, 2026; 3 months ago; Linux: 15.80.4 / July 28, 2026; 3 months ago; Web: 15.80.4 / July 28, 2026; 3 months ago; Android (Note: Including ChromeOS): 15.80.207 / July 28, 2026; 3 months ago; iOS: 15.80.1 / July 28, 2026; 3 months ago; Windows (UWP-only, discontinued): 15.53.6 / April 15, 2024; 2 years ago
Tuenti	Android, iPhone, Windows Phone	Proprietary	Free	WebRTC, SIP, XMPP	iLBC, Opus	Yes	Unknown	Voice, video, Instant messaging, group chat, photo and video sharing, SMS and MMS, native and social network contacts integration, incoming call/IM push notifications.	
Twinkle	Linux	GPL-2.0-or-later	Free	SIP	G.711 A-law μ-law, G.726, GSM, iLBC, Speex narrow wide ultrawide	SRTP, ZRTP	3	Conferencing, chat, file transfer, Firefox integration, call redirection, voicemail, support of VoIP-to-Phone services	1.10.3; 19 February 2022; 4 years ago
Ventrilo	macOS, Windows, iOS, Android	Proprietary	Free	Unknown	Unknown	No	8	Conferencing, chat, text-to-speech	3.0.8
Viber	Linux, (Note: Viber must be first installed on a mobile phone to function on a desktop operating system) macOS, Windows, Android, Bada, BlackBerry OS, iOS, Series 40, Symbian, Windows Phone	Proprietary	?	Unknown	Unknown	Yes	Unknown	Varies by platform: Text, picture and video messaging on all, voice calling only on iPhone, Android and Microsoft's Windows Phone	Android: 20.4.3.0 / 2 July 2023; 3 years ago; iOS: 20.4.0 / 4 July 2023; 3 years ago; Windows: 20.2.0 / 12 June 2023; 3 years ago; macOS: 20.2.0 / 12 June 2023; 3 years ago; Linux: 20.3.0.1 / 14 June 2023; 3 years ago
Wire	Linux, Windows, macOS, iOS, Android, Web	GPLv3	not free	?	Audio: Opus Video: VP8	DTLS, SRTP	10	End-to-end encryption by default for everything, instant messaging, video call, video group call, file sharing, GIF sharing, push to talk, edit message, delete message (on both side), timed messages, doodling, identity verification, screen sharing (desktop only)	?
Yate Client	Linux, macOS, Windows	GPL	Free	SIP, IAX, XMPP, H.323	G.711a, G.711u, GSM 06.10, iLBC, Speex, G.723, G.726, G.728, G.729	SRTP, maybe ZRTP?	Unknown		6.0.0; September 2017; 9 years ago
Zfone	Linux, macOS, Windows	Proprietary (with viewable source)	Includes time bomb provision	SIP, RTP	Unknown	SRTP, ZRTP	Unknown		Beta 2008-09-04 (Linux 0.9.224), (macOS 0.9.246), (Windows 0.9.206)

== Mobile phones ==
For mobile VoIP clients:

Program	Operating systems	License	Open source	Protocols	Codecs	Encryption	Other abilities	Latest release
Jami	iOS, Android	GPLv3	Yes	SIP	Video: H264, VP8, MP4V, H263, Audio: Opus 48000 hz, G722 PCMA, PCMU	SRTP, SIP over TLS	?	Version 202103261733 March 2021; 5 years ago
Line	Android, iOS	Proprietary	No	?	?	?	?	
Signal	iOS, Android	GPLv3	Yes	WebRTC	Opus	TLS, Signal Protocol	End-to-end encryption by default for everything. CallKit and location privacy, one-to-one and group messaging, video calling, image/video sharing, timed messages, identity verification, screenshot blocking. Android only: SMS/MMS messaging, doodling, GIF sharing.	Android 5.2.3 / 15 September 2023 iOS 6.41.1 / 15 September 2023 Desktop 1.33.4 / 13 September 2023
Tango	iOS, Android, Microsoft Windows, macOS, Windows Phone	Proprietary, freeware	?	?	?	?	VoIP, Wi-Fi out & in, SMS over IP, call-through & call-back, instant messaging, videoconferencing	?
WhatsApp	Android, BlackBerry, iOS, Symbian, Windows Phone	Proprietary, freeware	No	?	?	ECDH, SRTP	VoIP and instant messaging over Wi-Fi or a data connection.	iOS: 26.37.73 / September 21, 2026; 50 days ago; Android: 2.26.37.71 / September 18, 2026; 53 days ago; Windows: 2.2636.100.0 / September 17, 2026; 54 days ago; macOS: 26.37.73 / September 21, 2026; 50 days ago

== Frameworks and libraries ==
Program	Operating systems	License	Protocols, based on, compatible with	Encryption	Other abilities	Key and target markets	Latest release
Telepathy, Farstream	Linux, macOS, Windows	LGPL	SIP, XMPP (Jingle), ICE (STUN/TURN), UPnP	No	Multi-user A/V conferencing, IM, collaborative applications	Mobile devices (Maemo, Meego), Linux desktop or embedded	spec 0.27.2; September 24, 2013; 13 years ago
OPAL	Windows, Linux (including embedded variants), macOS	MPL	SIP, H.323, IAX2, CAPI, VXML	Unknown	Multi-user A/V conferencing, IM, IVR	Softphones, softswitches, telephony application servers	3.14.3; October 10, 2014; 12 years ago
GNU oSIP	Linux, Windows, macOS, Android, iPhone, BlackBerry	LGPL	SIP, SDP	Unknown	Multi-user A/V conferencing, IM, IVR	Softphones, embedded and mobile devices, telephony application servers	4.1.0; December 18, 2013; 12 years ago

== Server software ==
Name	Operating systems	License	Protocols	Encryption	Notable features	Target markets	Latest release
3CX Phone System	Windows, Linux	Proprietary	SIP	TLS, SRTP	VoIP/VideoOverIP calls and conferencing, voicemail and instant messaging	< 50,000 users	18.2; December 8, 2021; 4 years ago
AskoziaPBX	Standalone program (Linux-based)	Proprietary	SIP, H.323, IAX, SCCP	No	ISDN, voicemail, conferencing, MOH, ACD, IVR, call forwarding, call recording	SMEs up to 50 users	5.4; September 2, 2017; 9 years ago
Asterisk PBX	Linux, BSD, macOS, Solaris	GPL-2.0+, optional: Proprietary	SIP, H.323, IAX, MGCP, VoFR, XMPP, Google Talk, TDM	TLS, SRTP	VoIP gateway, voicemail, basic accounting (expandable with ODBC-compliant database), billing, conferencing, hot desking, IVR trees with conditional logic, call waiting, automated call distribution	Enthusiasts, developers, enterprise users (capacity dependent on server design, scalable across multiple servers)	23.5.0 (27 August 2026; 2 months ago) 22.10.1 LTS (15 June 2026; 4 months ago); 21.12.3 (15 June 2026; 4 months ago); 20.20.1 LTS (15 June 2026; 4 months ago); 19.8.1 (7 July 2023; 3 years ago); 18.20.0 LTS (18 October 2023; 3 years ago)
Brekeke PBX	Linux, Windows Server 2016 and Server 2019	Proprietary	SIP	TLS, SRTP	VoIP/VideoOverIP calls and conferencing, voicemail	Hosted service providers, Mid-large enterprise	3.12.2.2; January 11, 2022; 4 years ago
CommuniGate Pro	Linux, BSD, macOS, Windows, Solaris, HP-UX, AIX	Proprietary	SIP, XIMSS, XMPP, WebRTC	SSL, TLS, SRTP	SIP Registrar/Proxy, Authentication, Diameter, RADIUS, ENUM	Mobile network operators, ISPs, SaaS providers	6.2.14; August 16, 2019; 7 years ago
Dial Gate VoIP Softswitch	Linux, Windows	Proprietary	SIP	TLS, SRTP	Billing server, real-time account and line monitoring, web portal	Softswitch users, service providers	4.3; June 1, 2014; 12 years ago
Dial-Office IP-PBX	Linux, Windows	Proprietary	SIP	TLS, SRTP	Unified communications, conference calls, remote worker support and voicemail	Small businesses, Mid-large enterprises	4.1; December 2013; 12 years ago
Elastix	Linux	Proprietary	SIP, IAX, H.323, XMPP	TLS, SRTP	Unified communication server that also supports chat, mail and fax.	Capacity dependent on server design, scalable across multiple servers	5.0.0; December 7, 2016; 9 years ago
FreeSWITCH	Linux, BSD, macOS, Solaris, Windows	Mozilla Public License	SIP, NAT-PMP, STUN, SIMPLE, XMPP, Google Talk (Jingle), IAX, H.323, MRCP, RSS, Skype	TLS, SRTP, ZRTP	Recording, Voicemail, Conferencing, RADIUS, ENUM, IM Proxy, Streaming, Media gateway, Soft-PBX, IVR (modular)	Large soft-switch users, home PBX users, softphone users	1.11.3 (August 28, 2026; 2 months ago) [±]
FreePBX	Linux, BSD, Solaris	GPL	SIP, IAX, H.323, XMPP	TLS, SRTP	Complete PABX Service, based on Asterisk and PHP 5.6; provides a full replacement for a legacy non-VoIP phone system; under current and active development	Scales from Raspberry PI (3 users) to multiple parallel clusters (10K+ simultaneous calls)	14.0; August 2017; 9 years ago
Galene	Linux, Unix, Mac OS, Windows	MIT Licence	WebRTC, WHIP	TLS, SRTP	Lightweight, efficient, easy to install and to administer	Teaching, conferences, meetings, self-hosting	1.1; June 2026; 5 months ago
GNU Gatekeeper	Linux, FreeBSD, macOS, Windows XP-2000-Vista-7	GPL	H.323	H.235	H.460.18 firewall traversal, routing, accounting	video conferencing, VoIP carriers large and small	3.7; August 15, 2014; 12 years ago
HERO Hosted PBX	Linux, Windows	Proprietary	SIP	TLS, SRTP	Unified Communications, billing server, cloud-based management and web interface	Mid-large enterprises, VoIP carriers and service providers, telecom operators	4.3; December 2013; 12 years ago
Murmur	Linux, BSD, macOS, Windows	BSD, GPL	CELT, Speex, Opus	TLS	Chat with (limited) embedded HTML, ACLs for user management, Customizable In-Game Overlay, Directional Audio, Plugin Support, Nested Channels	Individuals to Small and medium enterprise (25-5000 users)	1.2.17; September 24, 2016; 10 years ago
Kamailio, OpenSIPS (formerly named OpenSER)	Linux, BSD, Solaris	GPL	SIP, XMPP	TLS, SRTP	SIP registrar-proxy, authentication, Diameter, RADIUS, ENUM, least-cost-routing, many others	SIP Service Providers	5.2.8; October 2020; 6 years ago
SIP Express Router (SER)	Linux, BSD, Solaris	GPL	SIP	No	SIP Registrar/Proxy, Authentication, Diameter, RADIUS, ENUM, many others	SIP Service Providers	2.0.0 Ottendorf
sipXecs IP PBX	Linux	AGPL	Native SIP call control, XMPP	TLS, SRTP	Full redundancy (HA), instant messaging, voicemail, user portal, admin GUI, plug & play management including phones and gateways, fully featured	Enterprises between 10 and 10,000 users, multi-site	14.04.2; July 2014; 12 years ago
vzRoom	Windows	Proprietary	SIP	SSL, TLS, AES	Instant messaging-chat, VoIP, video, sharing (desktop, video, file), whiteboard, scheduler, recording	Individual to small and medium enterprise (2-1,000 users)	0.8.8.735; November 2010; 16 years ago
Yate	BSD, Linux, macOS, Windows	GPL	SIP, IAX, H.323, ISDN, XMPP (Jabber), Jingle (Google Talk), MGCP, SS7 over IP, Cisco SLT (Signalling Link Transport) (SS7 MTP2 backhaul over IP), SCTP, SCCP, TCAP, MAP CAMEL	SSL, TLS, SRTP	Voice, video, file transfer, data, H323 to SIP signalling proxy, instant messaging, IVR, PC2Phone and Phone2PC gateway, SCCP — GTT routing between networks, Secure Unified Communications, SIP registrar-proxy, SIP SBC (session border controller), USSD, voicemail, VoIP, VoIP to PSTN gateway, conference server (max 200 voice channels per conference), call centre server, prepaid and postpaid cards	Deployed on home servers and large networks with millions of users	6.3; February 2021; 5 years ago

== Secure VoIP software ==
=== VoIP software with client-to-client encryption ===
The following table is an overview of those VoIP clients which (can) provide end-to-end encryption.

Client name	Development status	Open source client	End-to-end authentication (Note: End-to-end authentication protects communications from man-in-the-middle attacks by the service provider.)	Encryption protocols				Forward secrecy	Multiple encryption	Encrypted group calling	Proxy, Tor
Client name	Development status	Open source client	End-to-end authentication	ZRTP	ECDH	DTLS	SRTP	Forward secrecy	Multiple encryption	Encrypted group calling	Proxy, Tor
FaceTime	Active	No	Yes	?	?	?	Yes	Yes	?	Yes	No
Jami	Active	Yes	Yes	No	?	Yes	Yes	Yes	?	Yes	?
Jitsi (Note: Only if the user has registered with a compatible SIP provider. Some SIP providers do not support certain encryption protocols.)	Active	Yes	Yes	Yes	No	Yes	Yes	Yes	Yes	Yes	?
Line	Active	No	?	?	?	?	?	?	?	No	No
Linphone	Active	Yes	Yes	Yes	?	Yes	Yes	Yes	Yes	?	No
Signal	Active	Yes	Yes	No	Yes	No	Yes	Yes	Yes	Yes	Depends
Skype (opt-in per conversation, one pair of devices per conversation)	Abandonware	No	Yes	No	No	No	Yes	?	?	No	No
Telegram	Active	Yes	Yes	No	No	No	No	Yes	?	No	No
Threema	Active	Partially (Note: Only the encryption related source code is open.)	Yes	No	Yes	Yes	Yes	Partially (Note: Only on the network connection, not on the end-to-end layer.)	Yes	No	No
Viber	Active	No	?	?	?	?	?	?	?	?	No
WhatsApp	Active	Partially	Yes	No	Yes	No	Yes	Yes	Yes	Yes	No
Wire	Active	Yes	Yes	No	?	Yes	Yes	Yes	Yes	Yes	No
Zfone	Abandonware	Viewable source	Yes	Yes	Optional	?	Yes	Yes	Yes	?	?

== See also ==
- Comparison of audio coding formats
- Comparison of cross-platform instant messaging clients
- Comparison of web conferencing software
- List of codecs
- List of SIP software
- List of video telecommunication services and product brands
- Matrix (protocol)
- Secure communication
- Comparison of user features of messaging platforms
