= List of SIP software =

This list of SIP software documents notable software applications which use Session Initiation Protocol (SIP) as a voice over IP (VoIP) protocol.

== Servers ==
=== Free and open-source license ===
A SIP server, also known as a SIP proxy, manages all SIP calls within a network and takes responsibility for receiving requests from user agents for the purpose of placing and terminating calls.

- Asterisk
- ejabberd
- FreeSWITCH
- GNU SIP Witch
- Kamailio, formerly OpenSER
- Mobicents Platform (JSLEE[2] 1.0 compliant and SIP Servlets 1.1 compliant application server)
- OpenSIPS, fork of OpenSER
- SailFin
- SIP Express Router (SER)
- Enterprise Communications System sipXecs
- Yate

=== Proprietary license ===
- 3Com VCX IP telephony module: back-to-back user agent SIP PBX
- 3CX Phone System, for Windows, Debian 8 GNU/Linux
- Aastra 5000, 800, MX-ONE
- Alcatel-Lucent 5060 IP Call server
- Aricent SIP UA stack, B2BUA, proxy, VoLTE/RCS Client
- AskoziaPBX
- Avaya Application Server 5300 (AS5300), JITC certified ASSIP VoIP
- Bicom Systems IP PBX for telecoms
- Brekeke PBX, SIP PBX for service providers and enterprises
- Cisco SIP Proxy Server, Cisco unified border element (CUBE), Cisco Unified Communication Manager (CUCM)
- CommuniGate Pro, virtualized PBX for IP Centrex hosting, voicemail services, self-care, ...
- Comverse Technology softswitch, media applications, SIP registrars
- Creacode SIP Application Server Real-time SIP call controller and IVR product for carrier-class VoIP networks
- Dialogic Corporation Powermedia Media Servers, audio and video SIP IVR, media and conferencing servers for Enterprise and Carriers.
- Dialexia VoIP Softswitches, IP PBX for medium and enterprise organizations, billing servers.
- GoTo Connect - Cloud phone system with unified communications and contact center capabilities.
- Grasshopper - Virtual phone system for entrepreneurs.
- IBM WebSphere Application Server - Converged HTTP and SIP container JEE Application Server
- Interactive Intelligence Windows-based IP PBX for small, medium and enterprise organizations
- Kerio Operator, IP PBX for small and medium enterprises
- Microsoft Lync Server 2010 & 2013
- Mitel Communications Director
- NEC SV7000 back-to-back user agent SIP PBX
- NEC UNIVERGE 3C Unified Communications and Collaboration software
- Nokia Siemens Networks hiQ8000
- Nortel SCS500
- Nortel SIP Multimedia Communication Server 5200
- Objectworld UC Server
- Oracle Communications Converged Application Server (OCCAS)
- Oracle WebLogic SIP Server
- Spirent SIP Server Platform
- ShoreTel IP phone systems with unified communications and contact center built in
- Snom One free/blue/yellow (Snom acquired and renamed pbxnsip) (SIP)
- Sterlite Technologies Neox IPPBX, IMS - ISC, Dial Center - OmniChannel Call Center, IVR products
- Sun Microsystems Sun GlassFish Communication Server
- Tadiran Telecom Coral Ipx family and Aeonix softswitch
- Tandberg Video Communication Server - SIP application server, media server and H.323 gateway
- Unify OpenScape Voice, OpenScape 8000 SIP softswitch, mediaserver, ... (SIP)
- Voice Elements Inventive Labs' .NET Voice Development software and SIP stack platform.
- Zultys MX250/MX30 IP PBXs for SMB and enterprise

== Clients ==
=== Free and open-source license ===
- Ekiga (formerly known as GnomeMeeting). SoftPhone, Video Conferencing and Instant Messenger. Since 2013, no longer maintained but still available under declining number of distributions.
- Jami, with GTK/Qt GUI, also supports IAX2 protocol, for Linux, OS X, Windows GPL
- Jitsi, a Java VoIP and Instant Messaging client with ZRTP encryption, for FreeBSD, Linux, OS X, Windows; LGPL
- Linphone, with a core/UI separation, the GUI is using Qt libraries, for Linux, OS X, Windows, and mobile phones (Android, iPhone, Windows Phone, BlackBerry)
- Twinkle, using Qt libraries, GPL, for Linux
- Yate client, using Qt libraries, GPL

=== Proprietary license ===
- Blink, for Mac
- Librestream's 2500 Camera, 5000HD camera, Onsight Cube (wearable/modular camera), Onsight Connect (Windows, iOS, Android).
- LifeSize Desktop, for Windows
- Phoner and PhonerLite, for Windows, Voice: G.711, G.722, G.726, GSM, iLBC, Speex, Opus; security: TLS, SRTP, ZRTP
- Polycom PVX, for Windows. Voice: G.711, G.722, G.722.1, G.728, G.729A, Siren Codec; Video: H.261, H.263, H.264; Data: T.120, People+ Content, H.239, H.323 Annex Q far-end camera control

=== Discontinued ===
- QuteCom, formerly named OpenWengo, using Qt libraries, GPL, for Windows, Mac, and RPM- DEB-based Linux, discontinued in 2016
- Gizmo5, formerly PhoneGaim, discontinued in 2011
- Empathy, using GTK libraries and Telepathy framework, GPL, discontinued in earliest visible, 2021.
- Windows Messenger versions 4 and 5 (not to be confused with Windows Live Messenger or MSN Messenger which do not support SIP)

== Mobile clients ==
=== Free and open-source license ===
- Jami for Android, iOS; GPL v3
- Linphone for Android, BlackBerry, iPhone, Windows phone; GPL v2

=== Proprietary license ===
- Acrobits for iOS and Android

== Session border controllers ==
- Acme Packet Session Director
- Audiocodes Mediant
- Genband Quantix SBC
- Ingate Systems Ingate SIParators
- Metaswitch Perimeta
- Kamailio

== Enabled firewalls ==
- Check Point VPN-1 firewalls, include complete SIP support for multiple vendors
- The firewall feature in Cisco IOS includes complete SIP support
- Cisco PIX/ASA firewalls include complete SIP support
- D-Link Firewall DFL-210/260/800/860/1600/2500 supports SIP (SIP-ALG) with firmware 2.20.01.05 and above
- Fortinet, all FortiGates running v280/v300 builds
- Intertex SIP transparent routers, firewalls and ADSL modems, for broadband deployments and SOHO market
- Juniper Networks Netscreen and SRX firewalls include complete SIP Application Layer Gateway support
- Linux Netfilter's SIP conntrack helper fully understands SIP and can classify (for QOS) and NAT all related traffic
- Netopia Netopia supports ALG
- PF, built-in OpenBSD firewall PF can handle the NAT through the "static-port" directive and the bandwidth control through the built-in queuing system of SIP connections
- pfSense, a firewall/router distribution based on FreeBSD and PF; has QoS that properly tags VoIP traffic and a SIP proxy package that is available for NATed endpoints. Its functionality can be expanded with packages like FreeSWITCH, a free/open source software communications platform for making SIP, voice and chat driven products.
- Secure Computing, SnapGear firewall includes siproxd SIP proxy, Sidewinder 7 firewall includes a SIP proxy
- SonicWall, supports SIP
- ZyXEL ZyWALL P1, 2Plus, 5 UTM, 35 UTM, 70 UTM, 1050, USG 100, USG 200, USG 300, USG 1000 supports SIP-ALG

== Libraries ==
- oSIP

== Test tools ==
- Codenomicon Defensics: commercial test automation framework
- Ixia (company) commercial SIP-VoIP and Video test and emulation and load test platform
- Mu Dynamics: commercial SIP-VoIP, RTSP-IPTV Triple Play service assurance platform

== See also ==
- Comparison of VoIP software
- List of video telecommunication services and product brands
- Mobile VoIP
