= Phoner =

Software released in 1998

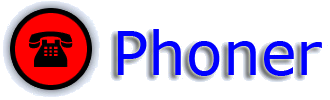

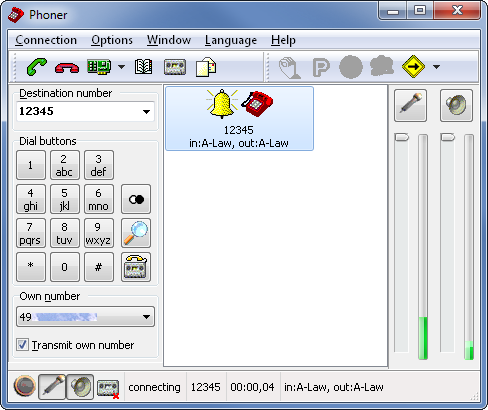
- Phoner on Windows 7
- Developer: Heiko Sommerfeldt
- Release: February 1998
- Stable release: 3.23 / March 5, 2021; 5 years ago
- Operating system: Microsoft Windows
- Size: 4.79 MB
- Available in: 12 languages
- List of languages English, German, Dutch, Italian, Greek, Czech, Bulgarian, French, Spanish, Persian, Portuguese, Polish
- Type: VoIP
- License: Freeware
- Website: phoner.de/index_en.htm

PhonerLite
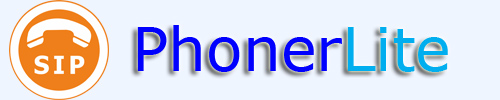

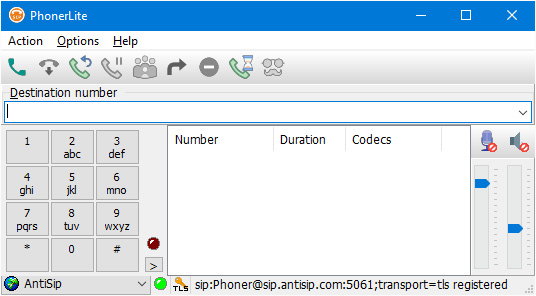
- PhonerLite on Windows 10
- Release: 1 June 2005
- Stable release: 3.38 / March 30, 2026; 6 months ago
- Size: 6.70 MB
- Available in: 10 languages
- List of languages Arabic, Czech, English, French, German, Italian, Polish, Portuguese, Russian, Spanish, Turkish
- Website: lite.phoner.de/index_en.htm

Phoner and PhonerLite are softphone applications for Windows operating systems available as freeware. Phoner is a multiprotocol telephony application supporting telephony via CAPI, TAPI and VoIP, while PhonerLite provides a specialized and optimized user interface for VoIP only. Besides the different user interface focus both programs share the same code base.

Both programs use the Session Initiation Protocol for VoIP call signalisation. Calls are supported via server-based infrastructure or direct IP to IP. Media streams are transmitted via the Real-time Transport Protocol which may be encrypted with the Secure Real-time Transport Protocol (SRTP) and the ZRTP security protocols. Phoner provides as well an interface for configuring and using all supplementary ISDN services provided via CAPI and thus needs an ISDN terminal adapter hardware installed in the computer.

Both programs support IPv4 and IPv6 connections by using UDP, TCP and TLS.

== Supported audio formats ==
- G.711 A-law: 64 kbit/s payload, 8 kHz sampling rate
- G.711 μ-law: 64 kbit/s payload, 8 kHz sampling rate
- G.722: 64 kbit/s payload, 16 kHz sampling rate
- G.726: 16, 24, 32 or 40 kbit/s payload, 8 kHz sampling rate
- GSM: 13 kbit/s payload, 8 kHz sampling rate
- iLBC: 13.3 or 15.2 kbit/s payload, 8 kHz sampling rate
- Speex narrow band: 15 kbit/s payload, 8 kHz sampling rate
- Speex wide band: 30 kbit/s payload, 16 kHz sampling rate
- Opus: 10-50 kbit/s, up to 48 kHz sampling rate
- G.729: 8 kbit/s payload, 8 kHz sampling rate
- Linear PCM: 705 kbit/s payload, 44.1 kHz sampling rate

== See also ==
- Comparison of VoIP software
- List of SIP software
- Opportunistic encryption
