= GNU SIP Witch =

- Developer: GNU Project
- Stable release: 1.9.15 / 13 December 2015; 10 years ago
- Platform: Linux, Mac OS X, BSD, Windows
- Available in: C++
- License: GPL (free software)
- Website: www.gnu.org/software/sipwitch

GNU SIP Witch is free SIP server software with peer-to-peer capabilities from the GNU Project. It is the GNU implementation of the Session Initiation Protocol (SIP), which is used for the routing of calls.

== Availability ==
SIP Witch is released as free software under the terms of version 3 or later of the GNU General Public License (GPL). It is designed for Linux, macOS, BSD and Windows.

== Technology ==
SIP Witch is written in the programming language C++ and uses the uCommon, eXosip and GNU oSIP libraries.

== Features ==
The software enables Voice over IP as part of a self-organising Peer-to-peer telephone network. It supports features like call forwarding, call distribution, call hold, presence information and (text) messages, supports encrypted calls and also enables NAT traversal to establish the peer-to-peer connections.

== History ==
The SIP Witch has been developed since the 10th of August 2007 by David Sugar within the GNU Telephony project. The first version was 0.1.0. Version 1 was released on May 14, 2011. It is being used as a component of GNU Free Call, which is supposed to be an alternative to Skype.

== See also ==
- List of SIP software – other SIP related programs
- FreeSWITCH
