= Twinkle (software) =

App for voice communications over VoIP protocol

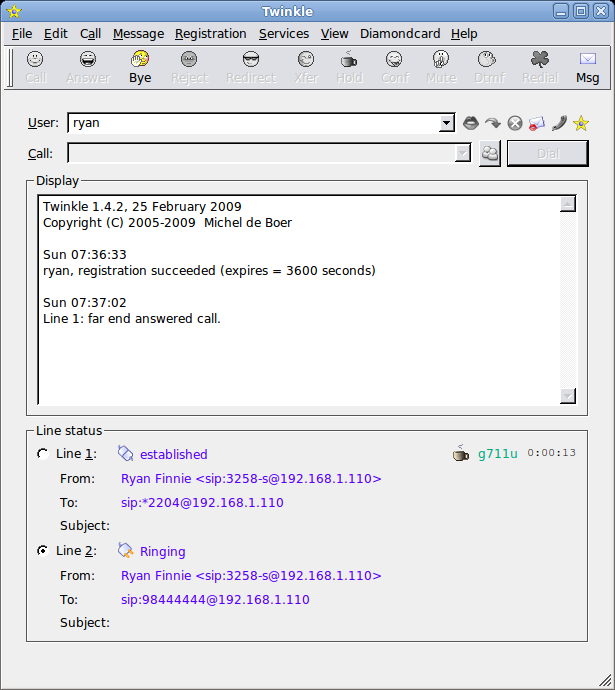
- Developers: Michel de Boer, Luboš Doležel
- Initial release: 27 April 2005
- Stable release: 1.10.3 / 19 February 2022
- Repository: github.com/LubosD/twinkle
- Written in: C++
- Operating system: Linux
- Platform: Qt
- Type: VoIP
- License: GPL-2.0-or-later
- Website: twinkle.dolezel.info

Twinkle is a free and open-source application for voice communications over Voice over IP (VoIP) protocol.

== Architecture ==
It is designed for Linux operating systems and uses the Qt toolkit for its graphical user interface. For call signaling it employs the Session Initiation Protocol (SIP). It also features direct IP-to-IP calls. Media streams are transmitted via the Real-time Transport Protocol (RTP) which may be encrypted with the Secure Real-time Transport Protocol (SRTP) and the ZRTP security protocols.

Since version 1.3.2 (September 2008), Twinkle supports message exchange and a buddy-list feature for presence notification, showing the online-status of predefined communications partners (provider-support needed).

== Supported audio formats ==
- G.711 A-law: 64 kbit/s payload, 8 kHz sampling rate
- G.711 μ-law: 64 kbit/s payload, 8 kHz sampling rate
- G.726: 16, 24, 32 or 40 kbit/s payload, 8 kHz sampling rate
- GSM: 13 kbit/s payload, 8 kHz sampling rate
- G.729: 8 kbit/s payload, 8 kHz sampling rate
- iLBC: 13.3 or 15.2 kbit/s payload, 8 kHz sampling rate
- Speex narrow band: 15.2 kbit/s payload, 8 kHz sampling rate
- Speex wide band: 28 kbit/s payload, 16 kHz sampling rate
- Speex ultra wide band: 36 kbit/s payload, 32 kHz sampling rate

== See also ==
- Comparison of VoIP software
- List of SIP software
- List of free and open-source software packages
- Opportunistic encryption
