= OSIP =

VoIP software library

- Original author: Aymeric Moizard
- Developer: Antisip SARL
- Stable release: 5.1.1 / January 17, 2020; 6 years ago
- Written in: C
- Operating system: Windows, macOS, Linux, FreeBSD, iOS, Android, BlackBerry OS
- Type: Voice over IP, instant messaging, videoconferencing
- License: LGPLv2.1-or-later
- Website: osip.org
- Repository: git.savannah.gnu.org/cgit/osip.git

oSIP is a free software library for VoIP applications implementing lower layers of Session Initiation Protocol (SIP). The library includes the minimal codebase required by any SIP application and offers enough flexibility to implement any SIP extension or behavior. Started in September 2000 and published in April 2001, oSIP is among the oldest SIP free software stack still being developed and maintained. The project was made part of the GNU Project as GNU oSIP in 2002.

== Software using oSIP ==
- eXosip, the "eXtended osip" library. An extension of oSIP for softphone implementation written by Aymeric Moizard.
- GNU SIP Witch

== Software that used oSIP ==
- Linphone. Linphone has been the first project based on oSIP and eXosip.
- Jami (software).
- FreeSWITCH.

== Usage in academic research ==
- Yang, Yang (2007). SIP over Client Initiated Connections (Thesis). Helsinki University of Technology. Archived from the original on 2016-04-02.
- Burgy, Laurent (2008). Approche langage au développement du support protocolaire d'applications réseaux (PDF) (Thesis). University of Bordeaux 1.
- Dai, H B (2008). Theory and Implementation of VoIP Based SIP Protocol (Thesis). Chinese Geology University (Beijing).
- Wang, H (2008). The Design and Development of IP Phone's Added-Vale Services Based on SIP Protocol (Thesis). Beijing University of Posts and Telecommunications.
- SongYuNa (2009). The Research and Development of Embedded VoIP Gateway Based on IXP425 (Thesis). Tianjin University. Archived from the original on 2014-02-03.
- Zhang, Z H (2010). Research And Implementation Of IP Phone Terminal Based On SIP Protocol (Thesis).

== See also ==
- List of SIP software
