= Sipgate =

German telecommunications company

Sipgate GmbH
- Company type: GmbH
- Traded as: sipgate, simquadrat
- Industry: Communications services
- Founded: 2004 - Düsseldorf, NRW, Germany
- Headquarters: Düsseldorf, NRW, Germany
- Area served: Germany, UK
- Products: Phone over Internet (VOIP) and mobile telephony, Internet services
- Number of employees: 300 (2022)
- Divisions: Sipgate Germany, Sipgate UK, Simquadrat
- Website: www.sipgate.de

Sipgate, stylised as sipgate, is a European VoIP and mobile telephony operator.

== Company ==
Sipgate was founded in 2004 and became one of Germany's largest VoIP service providers for consumers and small businesses. Through its network, which used SIP protocol, it allowed making low-cost national and international calls and provided customers with an incoming geographical phone number. Customers were expected to use a client software or a SIP-compliant hardware (a VoIP phone or ATA) to access its services.

Since 2011, Sipgate's network has been using the open-source project Yate for the core of its softswitch infrastructure.

Sipgate are among the sponsors of the Kamailio World Conference & Exhibition. In January 2013, the firm entered the German mobile phone market as a full MVNO. Sipgate's German mobile phone services run over the Telefónica Germany network.

== Products ==
sipgate team

Introduced in 2009, the product is a hosted business phone system (PBX) providing online management of phone services for 1 to 250 Users. All billing, end user management, call management, etc. is through an online portal. A mobile solution was released in Germany in early 2013 that can be integrated with the 'Team' business VoIP service. SIM cards can be used as extensions in the Team web telephone system or used individually with mobile and landline numbers.

sipgate trunking

In Germany, SIP trunking services connect customer's third party VoIP PBXs via broadband with the public telephone network. SIP trunking can be combined with the team product.

sipgate basic and sipgate basic plus

The basic residential VoIP service was released in Germany and the UK in January, 2004. Basic accounts receive one free UK or German geographic 'landline' phone number and a voicemail box. With a suitable fax-enabled VoIP adapter faxes may also be sent from conventional fax machines.

On 6 October 2014, the firm released an open API sipgate io.

== Discontinued products ==
Sipgate logo used from 2004 until 2017

Smartphone apps

Sipgate provided a software application called sipgate for use with Apple iOS and Android devices. In September 2008, the Higher Regional Court of Hamburg (Germany) sided with a request by T-Mobile and issued an injunction preventing the download of sipgate, barring iPhone owners from placing calls over the device's Internet connection rather than over T-Mobile's cellphone network. In counter action, Sipgate won an injunction against T-Mobile to bar it from advertising unlimited Internet access via the device. In March 2013 support and further development of the smartphone VoIP apps was ceased.

Services in United States and Austria

Sipgate operated a subsidiary which provided sipgate-branded VoIP services in Austria and the US. On 31 December 2013, the company discontinued Austrian operations citing negative regulatory restrictions imposed by the Austrian telecommunications regulator RTR. The RTR imposed rulings that a company can only supply a telephone number to a property if they also supply the associated cabling.

All services provided by Sipgate Inc (USA) were discontinued as of 31 October 2013.

sipgate one

sipgate one was a product that allocated the customers a German mobile number and incoming calls were then forwarded to customer's landline number or Skype. The service was discontinued on 31 July 2013.

== See also ==
- List of VOIP companies
