= Eyeball Chat =

- Developer: Eyeball Networks
- Initial release: October 3, 2000; 25 years ago
- Stable release: 3.2 / October 2009
- Operating system: Microsoft Windows XP or better
- Platform: Intel x86 - 32-bit
- Size: 7.1 MB
- Available in: English
- Type: Video conference
- License: Proprietary
- Website: www.eyeballchat.com

Eyeball Chat is a proprietary freeware VoIP, video telephony soft phone with multiple-protocol instant messaging for Windows PCs, developed by Chris Piche and Eyeball Networks in Vancouver, and first released in 2000. The software is free for personal use.

== Features ==
Eyeball Chat allows text message exchanges with individuals or conferences, and with AIM, Google Talk, MSN Messenger and Yahoo! Messenger buddies, drag-and-drop file and photo sharing, free voice calls between PCs and (via SIP gateway) from PCs to phones, video chat and video conferencing with up to 5 people, picture-in-picture, still snapshots during video calls, custom avatars, and chat rooms with privacy options. Call management includes call blocking, call hold/un-hold, call transfer, and call forwarding, and standards-based communication protocols SIP and STUN, TURN, and ICE support traversal of NAT routers as well as HTTP tunneling and UPnP. Presence is supported with XMPP and SIMPLE.

== History ==
At its introduction in October 2000, features of the software included "proprietary media delivery technology", a contact list to monitor online and offline status and to enable a one-click video chat session, control of picture size, frame rate, and audio performance, and other "media quality attributes". Services available for a paid subscription were to include "multi-party video conferencing -- up to six people, video messaging -- record, send, and play video messages, and web-based access -- initiate video chat session and view video messages from any browser." At the time, Eyeball Networks stated that it intended "to charge fees for certain types of use of the Eyeball Chat System, and for the use of some of the features of the system" but in 2009, this was replaced by a requirement that large institutional users should buy one of the company's "enterprise products and/or solutions."

Upon its release, the software was described in The Washington Post as "the first Web video chat service I've tested that seems easy to use" and "similar to videoconferencing programs from Microsoft and other companies, but simpler, and it provides high-quality images."

Beta version 0.9 of Eyeball Chat LE was reviewed in Internet Telephony Magazine, which stated, "the video and audio quality can be very good, especially with a first-rate camera. The settings are very customizable, and its floating interface has its pluses. For these reasons, and especially for the multi-party conferencing abilities", the software received the Editor's Choice award. It received a Communications ASP Magazine 2000 "Product of the Year" award, and a variety of other accolades.

Version 1.1 incorporated text messaging and window docking; version 1.21 (April 2001) incorporated better video capture and firewall support, call blocking, improved text messaging and web integration. The PC Magazine May 2001 review of Eyeball Chat LE v1.21 approved of the product's "breadth of control", including image resizing, automatic or manual frame rate and quality adjustments, and its management features for call blocking, information privacy, and text chatting or video answering of calls. On the other hand, it was "not quite ready for prime time" because Internet congestion resulted in video and audio degradation, required multiple connection attempts, and the audio lag required speaking "at a deliberate pace, punctuated by pauses". Overall, "Eyeball chat should be graded on a curve", and it was deemed "pretty neat."

In 2002, with version 2.0, Eyeball Chat chatrooms migrated from the web into the application, requiring web login only for user profile editing. Video message recording and sending were added, as was IM with AIM, MSN Messenger, and Yahoo! Messenger, and improved contact management and privacy settings.

In its 2002 review, ZDNet UK gave Eyeball Chat 2.0 a score of 5.6 (out of 10). The program's connectivity to AIM, MSN, and Yahoo for sending recorded video messages, real-time video with other Eyeball users, and its installation simplicity were all listed as "pros", but its "hyped-to-the-hilt video-message delivery service"'s inability to interoperate from behind a firewall, lack of ICQ support, no private chat rooms, and "nearly nonexistent" technical support were listed as "cons". It worked "like a charm" with other Eyeball Chat users. The review summarized, "Eyeball Chat 2.0 promises more than it can deliver. For now, Trillian is a better interoperable messenger, since that client handles ICQ too. For video chat, turn to Yahoo Messenger; if you have Windows XP, go for Windows Messenger."

Version 2.1 of the software addressed some criticisms by improving firewall support for live video chat and video messaging, and "video adaptation", and version 2.2 (August 2002) improved frame rates and audio, support for AIM, MSN, and Yahoo!, improved firewall support, and added new chat rooms. In its August 2002 review, USA Today gave the program 3 out of 4 stars, noting that its video and audio quality was "snappier and sonically cleaner than the competition until Yahoo upgraded its product last week", but, without high-speed Internet connection, video was "virtually unwatchable."

Eyeball Chat version 2.2 was released June 5, 2002. In 2009, Eyeball Chat 3.0 was released with a redesigned interface, and provides PC-to-phone capabilities.

In its May 2011 review of Eyeball Chat 3.1, BSTDownload.com gave the software 4.5/5 stars, stating that it can "import buddies from other services like Google Talk, Yahoo Messenger and MSN", "supports drag-and-drop file sharing and video conferencing (5 simultaneous users maximum)," has picture-in-picture, and snapshots during video chat, can make audio-only PC to PC calls, has an "embedded address book," and supports custom avatars. Detailed scores for resource usage: 29/35, ease of use: 19/20, look and feel: 9/10, and for functionality: 32/35.

In 2011, version 3.2 was announced. The French Tom's Guide made note of the software's emphasis on video (as opposed to Windows Live Messenger) and the integration of phone list with contact list, and referred to the video and audio quality as "fluid and fast". The Dutch Personal Computer Magazine gave the software 2.5 (of 5) stars, called its microphone operation "slow" and the process of adding a contact "clumsy", disliked that the incoming call window is not automatically moved to the front of other windows, and that since Eyeball Chat does not use invitations (like Skype), it's not possible to see who is adding you to their contacts list.

Eyeball Networks states that as of 2009, Eyeball Chat has over 7 million registered users.

On 13 May 2014, Eyeball Chat closed its chatrooms to all users, stating in the client software advert panel that this is "due to abuse of the system" although the client remains active and the remaining users can still communicate through private messaging, including voice and video chat. Constant attacks, exploits and third-party malicious clients have plagued Eyeballchat since version 2.2. New users remain able to sign up and download the client software.

== Related products ==
Eyeball Chat Server enables high-volume private-network use of Eyeball Chat at large institutions. Version 1.0 of the product won an Internet World 2001 Best of the Internet award in the Communication and Collaboration category,

== See also ==
- Comparison of VoIP software
