= Linphone =

Voice over IP software

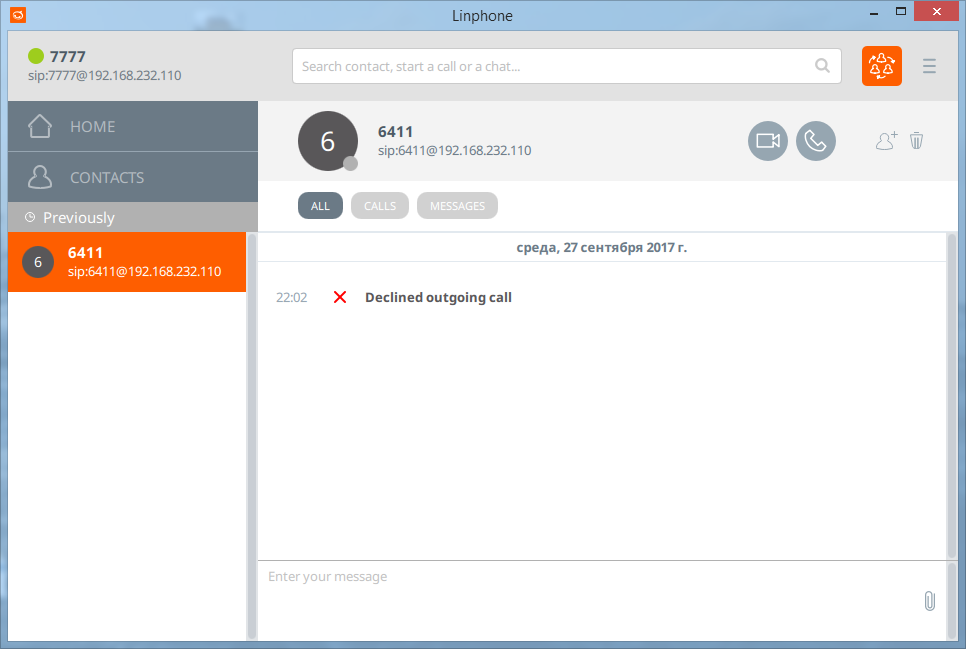
- Linphone running on Windows
- Original author: Belledonne Communications
- Developer: Linphone

Stable release(s)
- Android: 4.5.6 / 8 November 2021
- iOS: 4.5.1 / 8 October 2021
- Linux: 5.2.4 / 11 April 2024
- macOS: 5.2.4 / 11 April 2024
- Windows: 5.2.4 / 11 April 2024

Preview release(s)
- Android: 6.1.0-alpha / 11 March 2025
- iOS: 6.0.0-beta / 4 April 2025
- Written in: C, Java, C#, Python
- Operating system: Linux, OpenBSD, FreeBSD, Windows, Mac OS, iPhone, Android, Windows Phone
- Size: 8–17 MB
- Available in: Multilingual, including English, Arabic, Dutch, French, German, Japanese, Russian and Traditional Chinese
- Type: Voice over IP, instant messaging, videoconferencing
- License: GPL-3.0-or-later or proprietary
- Website: linphone.org
- Repository: gitlab.linphone.org/BC/public/linphone-desktop.git

Linphone (contraction of Linux phone) is a free voice over IP softphone, SIP client and service. It may be used for audio and video direct calls and calls through any VoIP softswitch or IP-PBX. Linphone also provides the possibility to exchange instant messages. It has a simple multilanguage interface based on Qt for GUI and can also be run as a console-mode application on Linux.

Both SIP service and software could be used together, but also independently: it is possible to connect Linphone service with any SIP client (software or hardware), and to use Linphone software with any SIP service.

The softphone is currently developed by Belledonne Communications in France. Linphone was initially developed for Linux but now supports many additional platforms including Microsoft Windows, macOS, and mobile phones running Windows Phone, iOS or Android. It supports ZRTP for end-to-end encrypted voice and video communication.

Linphone is licensed under the GNU GPL-3.0-or-later and supports IPv6. Linphone can also be used behind network address translator (NAT), meaning it can run behind home routers. It is compatible with telephony by using an Internet telephony service provider (ITSP).

== Features ==
Linphone hosts a free SIP service on its website.

The Linphone client provides access to following functionalities:

- Multi-account work
- Registration on any SIP-service and line status management
- Contact list with status of other users
- Conference call initiation
- Combination of message history and call details
- DTMF signals sending (SIP INFO / RFC 2833)
- File sharing
- Additional plugins

=== Open standards support ===
==== Protocols ====
- SIP according to RFC 3261 (UDP, TCP and TLS)
- SIP SIMPLE
- NAT traversal by TURN and ICE
- RTP/RTCP
- Media-security: SRTP and ZRTP

==== Audio codecs ====
Audio codec support: Speex (narrow band and wideband), G.711 (μ-law, A-law), GSM, Opus, and iLBC (through an optional plugin)

==== Video codecs ====
Video codec support: MPEG-4, Theora, VP8 and H.264 (with a plugin based on x264), with resolutions from QCIF (176×144) to SVGA (800×600) provided that network bandwidth and CPU power are sufficient.

== Gallery ==
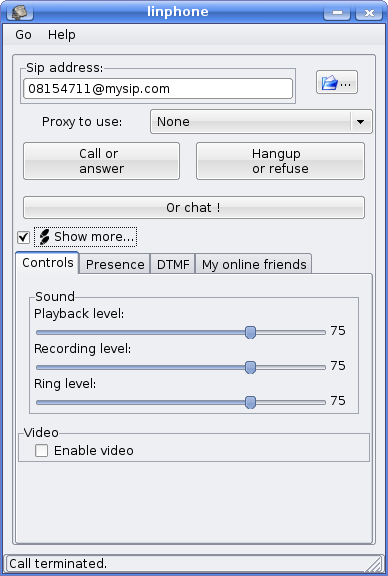
One of initial version's interface of Linphone in Linux (GNOME)

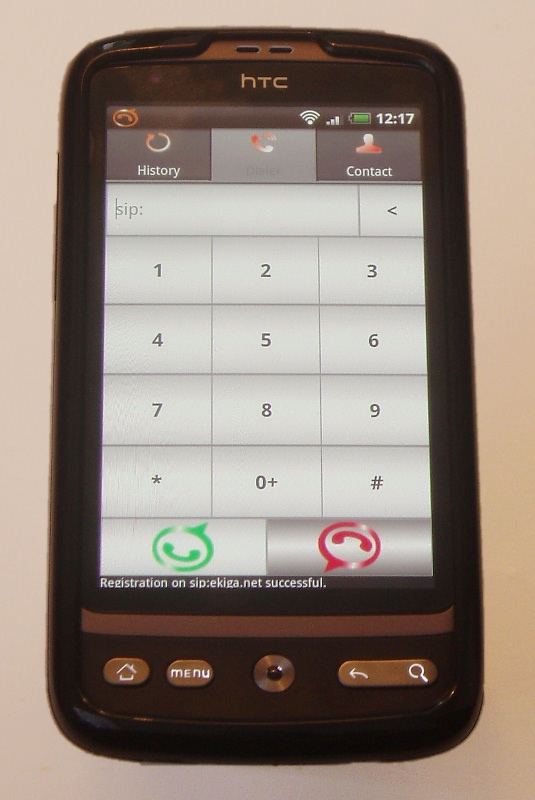
Linphone running on HTC Desire

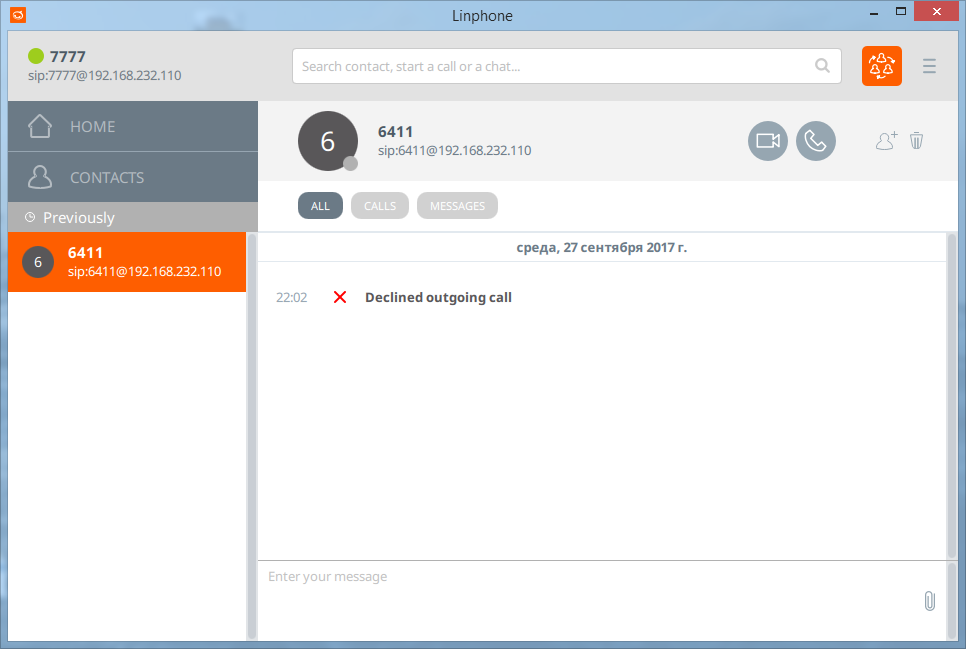
Linphone 4.1 working on Windows 8 (main screen)

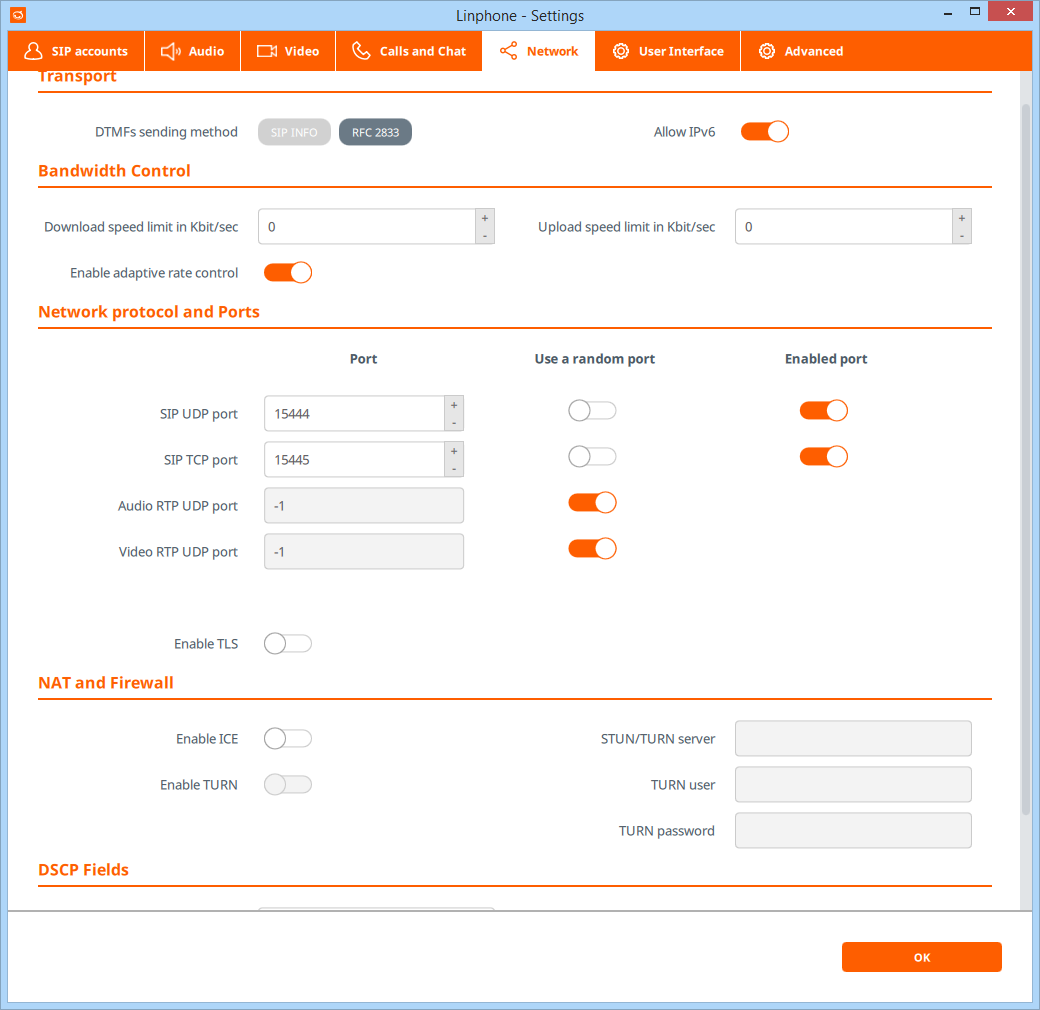
Linphone 4.1 settings on Windows 8

== See also ==
- Comparison of VoIP software
- List of SIP software
- Opportunistic encryption
