= Jonathan Rosenberg =

Jonathan Rosenberg may refer to:

- Jonathan Rosenberg (mathematician) (born 1951), American mathematician
- Jonathan Rosenberg (technologist) (born 1961), advisor to Google CEO Larry Page
- Jonathan Rosenberg (SIP author) (born 1970s), CTO at Cisco and former Skype employee
- Jonathan Rosenberg (artist) (born 1973), webcomic artist
- Jonathan Rosenberg (historian), American musical historian
