= Blink (SIP client) =

Free Voice-over-IP software

- Developer: AG Projects
- Initial release: December 1, 2009
- Stable release: Blink Pro for macOS 5.2.0 (June 26, 2021; 4 years ago) [±] Blink for Windows 5.2.0 (February 27, 2022; 4 years ago) [±] Blink for Linux 5.2.0 (June 9, 2022; 3 years ago) [±]
- Written in: Python
- Operating system: macOS, Microsoft Windows and Linux
- Size: 30M Cocoa version 20M Qt version
- Available in: English
- License: Blink License (free software versions + Shareware versions)
- Website: icanblink.com
- Repository: https://github.com/AGProjects/blink-qt

Blink is a Session Initiation Protocol (SIP) client distributed under the Blink license (GNU GPLv3 with an exception to permit the inclusion of commercial proprietary modules).

The software is written in Python for macOS's Cocoa, with a later port to Qt for supporting Microsoft Windows, Linux, AmigaOS.

== Features ==
Blink is based on the Session Initiation Protocol, and beyond voice over IP, its features also include video, instant messaging, file transfer and multi-party conferencing sessions based on MSRP protocol, remote desktop sharing using Remote Framebuffer (RFB) protocol (VNC), and SIMPLE presence using XCAP protocol. Compatible with Asterisk.

=== Alternative to Skype ===
According to Jason Hibbets, an Advisor at Red Hat, Blink is a popular alternative to Skype

=== Privacy and Security ===
The Linux and macOS version of Blink implement OTR protocol end-to-end encryption and peer verification for chat media. All versions provide audio and video media encryption using ZRTP.
