= Ingate =

Ingate may refer to:

- Ingate Systems, a Swedish network security and telecommunication company
- Ingate, a device used in casting a pattern
- Gordon Ingate (1926–2026), Australian sailor
- Ingate, a place in Alabama, US
