= Objectworld Communications =

Software company in Canada

Objectworld Communications Corp.
- Company type: Private
- Industry: Telecommunications; Computer software
- Founded: Ontario, Canada (1994, as ObjectWorld, Inc.)
- Headquarters: 308 Legget Drive, Ottawa, Ontario
- Website: www.objectworld.com

Objectworld Communications Corp., formerly ObjectWorld Inc, was a privately held company that provides unified communications software to small- and medium-sized businesses. Objectworld was acquired by Huntsville, Alabama-based ADTRAN Inc.

Objectworld created products focused on the Microsoft Windows operating system platform targeted towards IT-centric installation, administration and maintenance of unified communications infrastructure.

Objectworld’s flagship product, UC Server, acts as either an adjunct extension to existing PBX systems, or as an IP-telephony-based replacement for traditional communications systems. UC Server can provide complete business communications (telephones, auto-attendants, voice mail, unified messaging, fax server, IVR, telemarketing, conferencing, etc.) by integrating with various third-party products (SIP telephones, SIP gateways, etc.), and with Microsoft Windows Active Directory, Microsoft Exchange Server and Lotus Domino. UC Server is targeted to be administered and maintained by IT system administrators.

== Products ==
- Objectworld Unified Communications Server (UC Server): Introduced in March 2006, a Microsoft Windows-based unified communications solution currently sold in 3 editions as an adjunct to existing PBXs or with an integrated SIP communications system (VoIP)).
- CallAttendant Office (now called UC Server): Introduced in 2001, a unified communications solution that was adjunct to existing PBXs.
- CallAttendant, CallAttendant Home, CallAttendant Pro: Discontinued home and small business products that worked TAPI based devices (primarily voice modems) to provide advanced call answering capabilities.

== Awards ==
- 2008: CompTIA Channel Summit Best of Show, CompTIA Channel Summit Best Software Product, CompTIA Channel Summit Best Presentation
- 2007: IDC Ten Canadian Companies to Watch Award, CompTIA System Builder Best Software Product, CompTIA System Builder Best Solution Sales Strategy
- 2006: Deloitte and Touche Fast 50 Companies to Watch
- 2005: CompTIA Breakaway 2005 CT Summit Best Product-Software

== History ==
Objectworld Communications Corp was founded in 1994 as ObjectWorld Inc. by Behrouz Poustchi, initially as a consulting company. In 1996, its second employee Robert Turner joined, and other staff were soon added. During these early years, ObjectWorld consulted on and developed telecommunications technology and products (SS7, video conferencing) with clients such as MPR Teltech and the Canadian Research Council. In 1998, ObjectWorld released CallAttendant a home and small-office telephony product and automated telephone answering system that provided sophisticated call-flow definitions using a graphical drag-and-drop user interface. The user interface was unique in that it made advanced telephony answering services accessible to less knowledgeable users without the need for scripting, programming or a detailed understanding of telephony.

In 2000, this product was transitioned into an adjunct PBX application; and the home and small-office products were discontinued. This new product was launched in March 2001 and named CallAttendant Office; it was targeted for small and medium-sized enterprises. CallAttendant Office worked with traditional PBXs to provide voice-mail, unified-messaging, auto-attendants and fax services and provided a very early unified communications solution.

Both the home and enterprise products won a variety of awards, including ZDNet Editors Picks, 2000 Teleconnect IT Expo Best of Show, 2001 Communications Solutions Product of the Year, 2001 Communications Convergence Best of Show, 2001 Teleconnect Best of Show, and 2002 Customer Interaction Solutions Editor’s Choice.

ObjectWorld continued to develop and expand the CallAttendant Office product. In April 2004, Objectworld Inc. was acquired by David Levy and David Schenkel with a co-investor Latitude Partners; a year later Growthworks Capital was added to the investment group. The company was renamed Objectworld Communications Corp. The CallAttendant Office product continued to evolve and expand into a unified communications solution. In March 2006, Objectworld Unified Communications Server (Objectworld UC Server) was introduced, which added SIP PBX capabilities to the existing adjunct services.
