= TeamTalk =

Internet conferencing software product

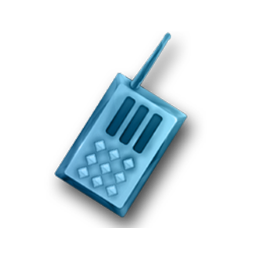

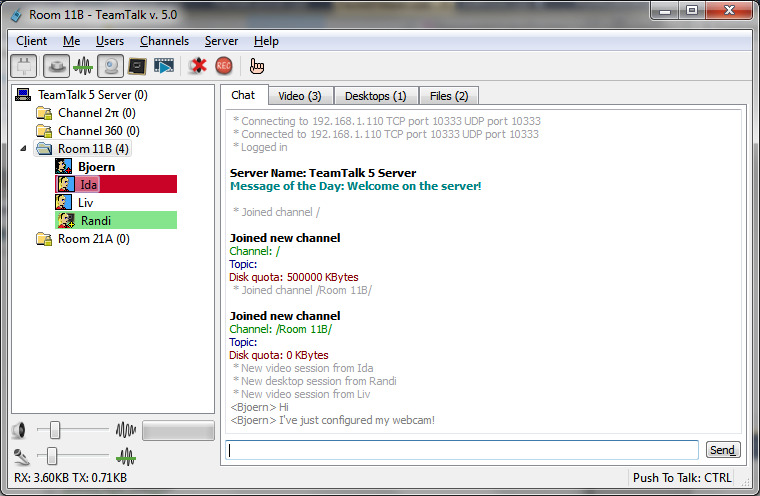
- TeamTalk 5 client application on Windows
- Original author: BearWare.dk
- Release: April 2003; 23 years ago
- Stable release: 5.21 / September 29, 2025; 9 months ago
- Operating system: Windows, Linux, OS X, iOS, Android
- Type: Conferencing software
- License: Proprietary, freeware
- Website: www.bearware.dk

TeamTalk is a conferencing system which people use to communicate on the Internet using VoIP and video streaming.

The TeamTalk conferencing system consists of a server and client application. Users are required to set up their own TeamTalk server before they can use the system. The TeamTalk server is available for Mac OS X, Windows and the widely used Linux distributions CentOS, Debian and Raspbian. The TeamTalk client application supports the same platforms as the server and additionally supports mobile platforms iOS and Android.

For voice encoding TeamTalk uses Opus and Speex audio codec. Video streams are encoded using VP8 video codec.

== Usage ==
The majority of TeamTalk users are visually impaired who use a screen reader for navigating in the user interface. To be as accessible as possible the TeamTalk client applications strive to only use standard window controls which can be detected by the screen reader.

== Development ==
The TeamTalk client applications are being developed on the GitHub project TeamTalk5. The TeamTalk server is proprietary and its source code is therefore not available publicly.

== License ==
TeamTalk is a freeware application and is available for download on popular software sites. By its license, it can be run on any number of servers or clients, or redistributed without charge. Developers wanting to write applications for TeamTalk must however buy a license.

== See also ==
- Comparison of VoIP software
- Skype
- Mumble
- Ventrilo
- TeamSpeak
