= Zultys =

US telecommunications company

Zultys, Inc.
- Formerly: Pivot VoIP
- Company type: Private
- Industry: Communications
- Founded: 2006
- Headquarters: Sunnyvale, California
- Area served: United States; Canada; Australia; UK
- Key people: Iain Milnes (Founder); Vladimir Movshovich (President and CEO); John Osgood (Executive Vice President of Sales and Marketing)
- Services: Cloud services
- Website: zultys.com

Zultys, Inc. is a privately owned software company headquartered in Sunnyvale, California. It develops unified communications products and integrated desktop IP phones. Zultys' business phone systems and contact center telephony services can be installed and operated as premises-based technology and as cloud-based software as a service.

== Corporate history ==
Headquartered in Sunnyvale, Zultys Technologies was founded by Iain Milnes in 2001 as a privately held company. The company launched its first product, the MX1200 IP phone system, in January 2003 followed quickly by its flagship product, the MX250. In the same year, branch offices were opened in London and Sydney, and Network World magazine named Zultys to its 2003 list of Top 10 companies to watch. By 2005 the company had 235 employees and branch offices in 10 different countries.

In September 2006, due to a sudden cancellation of planned capital investment, Zultys filed for Chapter 11 bankruptcy in Northern District of California court. In October 2006, Zultys Technologies' assets and intellectual property were put up for bankruptcy auction. The primary bidders in the auction were Nebraska-based InPath Devices, Telrad Connergy backed Pivot VoIP (a group composed of former Zultys engineers), and Ian Milnes. Pivot VoIP eventually won the bidding and acquired Zultys for US$2.65 million plus debt obligations, and operations and product portfolios were merged with Pivot. The new company was formed as Zultys, Inc., and Telrad Connegy's Chairman and owner, Avi Weinrib, was named President and CEO.

In November, 2009, Neil Lichtman was named CEO.

== Products ==
Zultys' primary product is its line of cloud and premises-based Zultys MX IP PBXs, which are based on SIP open standards.

Zultys IP phone systems offer features such as softphone, presence, secure chat, instant messaging, remote work, call centres, interactive voice response, automatic call distributor, automated and on-demand call-recording software, fax, integration of mobile devices into the office phone system and more. Client and administrative applications support Mac, Windows (32- or 64-bit), and Linux.

In 2014, Zultys launched MXvirtual, a cloud-based version of the MX IP PBX.
