= Creacode SIP Application Server =

- Developer(s): Creacode Ltd.
- Initial release: 2006
- Operating system: Microsoft Windows
- Available in: English, Turkish
- Type: VoIP
- License: Proprietary
- Website: Creacode Ltd.

Creacode SIP Application Server is a SIP call controller, SIP IVR, SIP Registrar and SIP NAT traversal software product.

== Features ==
Creacode SIP Application Server's javascript-like, event-driven scripting language (CCS) and internal APIs allow real-time control on SIP signals for building complex voice services in VoIP networks. It communicates with external web applications, RADIUS servers or ODBC compliant relational databases in order to save or retrieve data associated with each call session during execution of call services. IVR feature supports to play and record G711U, G711A and G729A audio codecs. Creacode SIP Application Server's core is written in unmanaged C++ code to meet high performance and scalability requirements. It runs on 32/64 bit Windows operating systems.

== Supported Standards ==
Creacode SIP Application Server is compliant with RFC 0821, 1325, 2327, 2616, 2833, 2865, 2866, 2976, 3261, 3264, 3515, 3550, 3565, 4566.
