= Nymgo =

British VoIP software application

- Developer(s): Splendor Telecom UK Ltd
- Initial release: April 2012
- Written in: C++ with Qt
- Available in: English
- Type: Voice over IP, SMS
- License: Freemium
- Website: nymgo.com

Nymgo (pronounced \ˈnim-ˌgo\) is a software application that makes calls from computers to landlines and mobile phones over the Internet through Voice over Internet Protocol (VoIP). Nymgo is a subsidiary of UK-based Splendor Telecom. It launched in December 2008 as a SIP-enabled international voice termination provider from fixed devices.

== History ==
In October 2010, Intel Capital announced that Nymgo would be one of the three companies receiving a Series A investment round from its $50 million start-up fund. Nymgo received a total of $5 million in this funding round.

In 2011, Nymgo received a joint investment from Intel Capital and The Abraaj Group for an undisclosed sum. Nymgo has since revamped its networking infrastructure to improve its core voice-only calling business model and has begun the process of rebranding its client apps and website user experience all the while preparing to roll out native smartphone applications for the iPhone and Android OS in early 2012.

== Rates ==
In 2011, Nymgo slashed rates in half to countries with teams participating in the 2010 World Cup.

== Customer service ==
When a customer encounters poor audio quality, Nymgo will test the line and refund the first two minutes of the call if the test reveals a network error.

Nymgo users periodically complain of dealing with unnecessary obstacles in buying credit (verification procedures, red tape) in certain countries.
