= SIP provider =

Provider of Session Initiation Protocol

A SIP provider (Session Initiation Protocol) is any telecommunications company which provides SIP trunking to customers, usually businesses. Many companies provide SIP "termination" (outbound calling) and "origination" (inbound calling), usually with a plain old telephone service (POTS) phone number, called a direct inward dialing (DID). Most companies that provide one also provide the other.

Outbound (termination) rates vary from provider to provider and can often depend on the type of number being called as well as the geographical destination. For example, since European cell phones have "calling party pays" billing, calling a London cell number can cost over US$0.20/minute, while calling a London landline can cost under US$0.01/minute.

Inbound calling prices are more varied, particularly in the US. Some providers offer flat rate pricing "per channel" (simultaneous call leg) while some offer an unlimited number of channels but a low, fixed per-minute rate. Some providers offer a choice of plan.

In both cases, a SIP-compatible softphone, PBX or softswitch is configured to place certain (or all) outbound calls through the SIP provider; likewise, the switch or softphone is configured to register with the SIP provider to be notified when a new inbound phone call is available to answer.
