= Kamailio =

Telephony software for SIP routing

- Developer: The Kamailio SIP Server Project
- Initial release: September 2002; 23 years ago
- Stable release: 6.1.3 / 27 May 2026; 9 days ago
- Written in: C
- Operating system: Linux, BSD, Solaris
- Type: SIP proxy
- License: GPL-2.0-or-later
- Website: www.kamailio.org
- Repository: github.com/kamailio/kamailio

Kamailio, formerly OpenSER (and sharing some common history with SIP Express Router (SER)), is a SIP server licensed under the GPL-2.0-or-later license. It can be configured to act as a SIP registrar, proxy or redirect server, and features presence support, RADIUS / syslog accounting and authorization, XML-RPC and JSON-RPC-based remote control, SQL and NoSQL backends, IMS / VoLTE extensions and others.

Kamailio is a Hawaiian word. Kama'ilio means talk, to converse. "It was chosen for its special flavour."

== Features ==
Kamailio is written in pure C with architecture-specific optimizations; it can be configured for many scenarios including small-office use, enterprise PBX replacements and carrier services—it is SIP signaling server—a proxy—aiming to be used for large real-time communication services. Features include:

- SIP telephony system
- SIP load balancer
- SIP security firewall
- Least cost routing engine
- IMS/VoLTE platform
- Instant messaging and presence services
- SIP IPv4-IPv6 gateway
- MSRP relay
- SIP-WebRTC gateway

== Usage ==
Kamailio is used by large Internet Service Providers to provide public telephony service. The largest public announced deployment with several million of users is in operation at the German ISP 1&1. Another large deployment is in operation at the provider sipgate.

== Forks ==
=== OpenSIPS ===
OpenSIPS, a fork of SER which has diverged—deciding to "go their own way" from the SER and OpenSER codebases—is a free software implementation of SIP for voice over IP (VoIP) that can be used to handle voice, text and video communication. OpenSIPS is intended for installations serving thousands of calls and is IETF RFC 3261 compliant. The software was recognized by Google in 2017 with their Open Source Peer Bonus award.

== History ==
Kamailio's roots go back to 2001, when the first line of SIP Express Router (SER) was written; at the time, the working group published results at iptel.org—in September 2002 the code itself was published under the GPL. The first fork of SER came in 2005—OpenSER—which would later merge back into the code that would become Kamailio. The codebases of SER and OpenSER (by then known as Kamailio) converged in December 2012, and it was decided to continue to use Kamailio as the main name of the project, which remains open source.

During the first years of development, serweb—a web-based user provisioning—was available.

=== Timeline ===

2001
- SIP Express Router (SER) is initially developed by the Fraunhofer Institute for Open Communication Systems (FOKUS)
2002
- First third-party contribution (ENUM module)

September
- Code is GPL'd and first published

2003
- Adoption by the general public begins; additional free and open source code is contributed by independent third parties
2004
- Part of the FOKUS team moves, with the SER copyrights, to the newly created company iptel.org
- Two of the five SER core developers and one main contributor start a new free and open source software project named OpenSER.
2005
- The company IPtel.org is bought by TEKELEC, and is responsible for the TEKELEC session router and CSCF.
2007

May 12
- SER 2.0 RC-1 (Ottendorf) is made available

2008

August
- OpenSER is renamed Kamailio to avoid conflict with similar trademarks
November 4
- Kamailio developers sketch and announce a plan to team up with the SER developers to create the future sip-router project

2013
- FOKUS and the Kamailio community organize the first iteration of the annual 'Kamailio World' conference in Berlin, Germany.
