= Common ISDN Application Programming Interface =

The Common ISDN Application Programming Interface (short CAPI) is an ISDN-conformant standardized software interface. With the help of CAPI, computer software intended for the use with ISDN can be provided, without knowledge of the deployed, proprietary ISDN card.

CAPI was designed from 1989 by German manufacturers (AVM, Systec, Stollmann). Since 1991, CAPI is being developed further by CAPI Association e.V. Implementations exist for different operating systems, including Linux and Microsoft Windows.

Through the ETSI, CAPI 2.0 was introduced as standard ETS 300 324 (Profile B).

Primarily, CAPI was designed for data transfer over ISDN. The specification has been extended multiple times, thereby it became important to the area of voice and fax communication. Because pure data transfer over IP-based networks is dominant in modern times, CAPI is being used primarily in the scope of voice applications (voice mail, IVR, call center, voice conference systems, etc.), for fax servers and combined systems (UMS).

The CAPI Interface in its current release (CAPI 2.0) supports a variety of signaling protocols (D channel protocols), e.g. DSS1 and FTZ 1 TR 6. The interface operates in the OSI model between layer 3 and 4, but only controls layers 1 to 3.

Besides popular signaling protocols for ISDN, implementations of CAPI for ATM, GSM and VoIP (H.323 and SIP) exist, thus CAPI applications can be used directly on communications infrastructure. Special extensions for protocol-specific features were defined several years ago for ATM.
