= VzRoom =

Video conferencing software

vzRoom
- Developer(s): Manipeer Limited
- Initial release: June 2008
- Operating system: Microsoft Windows
- Type: Voice over IP, instant messaging, videoconferencing
- License: Shareware
- Website: vzroom.com

vzRoom is a software system developed by Manipeer Limited for multi-party video conferencing, media sharing and VoIP phone integration. It was launched in July 2008.

== Features ==
=== Multi-party videoconferencing ===
Each conference room supports up to 63 concurrent users. Each user has an own room to host individual videoconferencing meeting and all users can share voice, camera and other multimedia to the users in the videoconferencing room. The meeting will be coordinated by the host of the room.

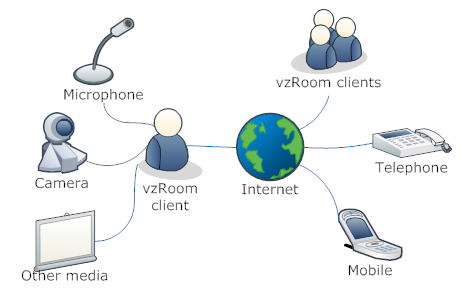
How vzRoom users communicate with each other by different means.

=== Media sharing ===
- Screen sharing
- Synchronous video sharing
- Multiple-user whiteboard
- Remote desktop
- File transfer
- Instant messaging

=== VoIP phone integration ===
vzRoom clients can connect to VoIP phone and merge the phone call with the conference room users.

System diagram of VoIP components in vzRoom.

=== Other features ===
- Discussion and presentation modes
- Scheduler
- Videoconferencing recording

== Applications ==
- Videoconferencing
- Distance education
- Karaoke

== Implementation ==
- Server installation: vzRoom allows users to build their own server.
