= Brekeke PBX =

- Developer(s): Brekeke Software, Inc.
- Initial release: 2004
- Operating system: Microsoft Windows, Linux,
- Available in: English/Japanese
- Type: VoIP
- License: Proprietary
- Website: Brekeke Software, Inc.

Brekeke PBX is a SIP-based IP-PBX system. This software was previously known as OnDO PBX from 2004 to 2006. Brekeke Software, Inc. released Version 2 of this software in 2007 and changed its name to Brekeke PBX. This software allows the user to establish relations among multiple phones (e.g., extensions, ring groups, etc.), to share lines among multiple phones and to provide call features such as voicemail, caller ID, call forwarding, call recording, etc. Brekeke Software, Inc. offers two versions of its Brekeke PBX software, single-tenant and Multi-Tenant version.

== SIP-Compliant ==
Brekeke PBX comes with a bundled SIP server and is fully SIP-compliant (RFC 3261 Standard), which ensures that it has the highest level of interoperability with other SIP devices and services.
