= Voice Elements =

Voice Elements is a Microsoft Cloud Service, as well as a Calling Plan for Microsoft Teams. Voice Elements were released by Inventive Labs Corporation in 2008, based on their original CTI32 toolkit. Software developers who use C#, VB.NET, or Delphi use Voice Elements to write telephony-based applications, such as Interactive Voice Response systems, Voice dialers, Auto Attendants, Call centers, and more.

== Voice Elements Software ==
In addition to the Microsoft .NET Framework, Voice Elements supports the use of speech recognition and text-to-speech, Dialogic TDM hardware, and the Inventive Labs HMP Elements SIP Platform. Applications built with Voice Elements are deployed via Voice over IP, via the Inventive Labs cloud hosting service, or by traditional TDM, such as T1, E1, or analog phone lines.

Users of Voice Elements-based solutions interact by using Touch Tone (DTMF) input or with voice commands through speech recognition technology. In addition, developers may program with pre-recorded prompts or use text-to-speech.

Common applications that are built using Voice Elements include:

- Tele-Integrations
- Customer Self-Service IVRs
- Call Centers
- Phone Systems
- Ticket Management
- Two-Factor Authentication
- Customer Surveys
- Store Locators
- Appointment Reminders
- Voice/SMS Broadcasts
- Political Polling
- Power Dialer
- Reservation Confirmation
- Collections
- SMS Marketing
- Emergency Notifications
- Order Status
- Delivery Reminders
- Flight Information
- Fundraising
- Alerts/Notifications
- IVRs.
- Conference Bridges

Typically, industries such as Health Care, Retail and Hospitality, and Financial Services use telephony applications to increase customer contact and automate tasks.

Visual Studio developers, by learning the Voice Elements classes, can create almost any voice application. Call logging and sample inbound and outbound applications are a part of the software package. Consulting services are also available for planning, creating, or training IT staff to develop and manage custom solutions.

If deployed via SIP, Voice Elements developers may use the highly tuned Call Progress Analysis that is included in the Inventive Labs SIP Platform. Call Progress Analysis results inform the software if a person or machine answers a call, and are used in outbound dialing campaigns.

Voice Features

- SIP Call Control with its internally developed VoIP stack
- Accurate Call Progress Analysis (CPA). (Detect Human or Machine)
- Beep Detection
- Speech Recognition
- Text To Speech (TTS)
- Conferencing
- Faxing
- WebRTC for Agent / Customer connections
- Call Routing
- Call Recording
- Play / Record computer files
- Tone Recognition (DTMF / Custom Tones)
- Whisper / Coaching

=== WebRTC ===
Voice Elements launched their WebRTC interface in August 2013, with their Voice Elements Platform 5. It includes a simple API for creating browser-based, feature-rich WebRTC applications.

This new feature was premiered at the WebRTC Conference & Expo, Atlanta GA, June 25–27, 2013.

WebRTC is a technology that allows you to use your browser simultaneously as a web browser and as softphone.

== Awards ==
- 2011 Product of the Year awarded to Inventive Labs Corp for "Voice Elements with Excellent Call Progress Analysis" at TMC Internet Telephony Conference
- 2012 Best of Show awarded to Inventive Labs Corp for "Best Development Tool" at TMC IT Expo, Austin, Texas. Innovation on Display: ITEXPO Austin
- 2012 Best of Show awarded to Inventive Labs Corp for "Best Development Tool" at TMC IT Expo, Miami, Florida.
