= Ingate Systems =

Ingate Systems AB (publ)
- Company type: Swedish public
- Industry: Telecommunication equipment
- Founded: Linköping, Sweden (2001)
- Founder: Karl Erik Ståhl
- Headquarters: Stockholm, Sweden
- Key people: Karl Erik Ståhl, CEO
- Products: Session Border Controllers, Firewalls, Routers, Modems
- Subsidiaries: Ingate Systems Inc., Hollis, US
- Website: www.ingate.com

Ingate Systems AB is a Swedish company that sells data network security and telecommunication equipment. The company primarily provides SIP Trunking of IP PBX:s on the US market. It is associated with sister company Intertex Data AB.

== History ==
Ingate Systems was founded in 2001 as a joint venture between the Swedish companies Intertex Data AB, which had developed the first SIP proxy-based SIP aware firewall for the SOHO and SMB market, and Cendio Systems AB, which had developed the Fuego enterprise firewall. Ingate developed SIP-capable enterprise firewalls and SIParators®, Ingate's brand of Session Border Controllers (SBC:s). Intertex became sister company to Ingate, with joint development, and continued its development of its embedded products, Ethernet and DSL access routers for telecom service provider's volume deployment of SIP services to the home and SMB LAN:s – products that include firewall, SBC and IP PBX functionality.

In the fall of 2012, the group companies Ingate and Intertex merged into current Ingate Systems, to join their efforts for global unified communication beyond traditional telephony using both the SIP standard and the emerging WebRTC standard and to cover the product range from home and SOHO to enterprise and carrier usage.

Since 2006, Ingate has hosted the SIP Trunking-Unified Communications Seminars at the IXEXPO conferences.

Ingate also participates in the SIP Trunking Community by TMCnet.

== Products ==
Ingate has a line of enterprise Session border controllers ranging from home and SOHO usage to enterprise and telecom service provider usage of up to 20,000 concurrent telephone calls.

The SBC:s are often used for SIP Trunking, i.e. connecting enterprise IP PBX:s to telecom service provider's SIP based Voice over IP (VoIP) connections. A wide range of IP PBX:s and service providers are supported by the Ingate startup configuration tool. Unified Communications (UC) solutions such as the Microsoft Lync and Cloud computing solutions such as the Microsoft Office 365 are also supported.

The Ingate products are all based on an SBC architecture where an IETF RFC 3261-compliant SIP proxy controls the NAT and firewall engine to route all types of media between parties on both public and private IP networks. All products include a routing SIP Proxy and a SIP registrar, and when required a SIP Back-to-back user agent (B2BUA), and can in addition to security at the enterprise edge, also do accounting by reporting usage in Call Detail Records. The Ingate products are not limited to VoIP but support full UC or multimedia real-time communication, and can route such communication over the Internet with or without service provider involvement.

Products are being developed to also support and enable the upcoming WebRTC standard, an initiative by Google to bring high quality multimedia real-time communication directly into the web browser.
