= AskoziaPBX =

Telephone system firmware

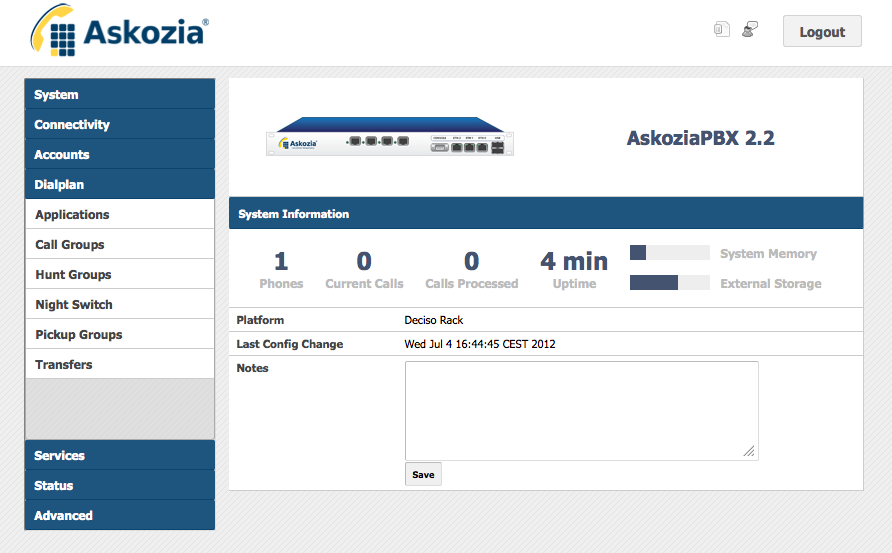
- Graphical user interface of AskoziaPBX
- Developer: IKT/Askozia
- Working state: Current
- Source model: Closed source
- Latest release: 5.1.1 / 22 November 2016; 9 years ago
- License: Commercial
- Official website: http://www.askozia.com

AskoziaPBX is a closed source telephone system (or "PBX") firmware. It is a fork of the m0n0wall project and uses the Asterisk private branch exchange (PBX) software to realize all telephony functions.

Prior to version 2.1, AskoziaPBX was released under a restricted BSD license. It permitted all forms of open source modification and distribution but required licensing if AskoziaPBX was to be sold on commercial products.

Since version 2.1, it has been released under commercial license only. Askozia also provides a "diet" version for testing. It has the full feature set, but is limited to two simultaneous calls.

Originally based on FreeBSD, AskoziaPBX was modified to run on Linux creating a new Linux distribution for this purpose. Running on Linux it has also been expanded to run on Blackfin and PowerPC CPU architectures in addition to the original x86.

== History ==
AskoziaPBX was started as a proof-of-concept project by Michael Iedema at the Ostfalia - School of Applied Sciences in Wolfenbüttel Germany in January 2007. The project focus was to demonstrate the feasibility of building an embedded telephone system firmware upon Open Source software while providing a consumer usability experience.

After six months of private development, the firmware was released to the public on 1 June 2007. During the next 14 months after the initial release, 24 public beta versions were released. At the end of this cycle, version 1.0 was published in September 2008. Minor fixes and language updates continued on the 1.0 branch until 1.0.3 was released in May 2009. At this point, work had already begun on what was to become the 2.0 branch of the firmware, the current development series.

Since 2011, AskoziaPBX is developed by Benjamin-Nicola Lüken and Sebastian Kaiser.

In August 2017, Askozia was acquired by 3CX Germany.

== Major features ==
AskoziaPBX is configured via a web-based configuration interface. It allows the configuration and interconnection of Analog, ISDN and VoIP telephones and of provider lines. Telephone system features such as voicemail, conference rooms, call parking, call transfers, fax-to-e-mail and text-to-speech are supported. More functionality can be implemented with custom applications or the Call Flow Editor. This is an additional software module for AskoziaPBX, which allows to create call queues, IVRs and other complex scenarios.

The firmware stores its entire configuration in a single XML file. This simplifies backing up and restoring installations. It takes care to only write to its internal storage when absolutely necessary. This is done to preserve write cycles on flash media, a typical installation media for embedded devices.

AskoziaPBX can run on systems with as little as 200 MHz and 64 MB of RAM. It runs on x86 and PowerPC architectures. Blackfin is only supported until software version 2.0.4.

== Internationalization ==
Created in Germany and initially only available in the English language, the firmware and project have now been internationalized. The configuration interface, voice prompts and notification messages have all been translated into many languages. German, Italian, Spanish, French and Dutch are the most complete with less complete translations including Chinese, Japanese, Polish, Danish and Swedish.

AskoziaPBX is in use in over 175 countries.

== Moving from FreeBSD to Linux ==
From late 2008 until mid 2009 the firmware was changed to use Linux as its operating system, replacing FreeBSD. This process was contracted by Auerswald, a German telecommunications hardware manufacturer and was done for several reasons: Asterisk was, at the time, only officially supported on Linux. Also, FreeBSD does not support the Blackfin CPU architecture, the architecture used in Auerswald's target platform.

Another Open Source project was forked and incorporated into the project to accomplish the difficult task of compiling, patching and assembling firmware images across multiple CPU architectures and target platforms. The T2 SDE project was stripped down to only include the software packages used in AskoziaPBX and then merged into the project as the new official build system.

In July 2009, an alpha level release running on Linux was published. This was further stabilized into a beta release on 13 February 2010. The final production ready firmware was released as version 2.0 on 4 May 2010.

== See also ==
- List of SIP software – other SIP related programs
