= Jonathan Rosenberg (SIP author) =

- Born: 1972 or 1973 (age 52–53)
- Education: MIT, Columbia University
- Occupation: CTO & Head of AI
- Employer: Five9
- Notable work: RFC 2543, RFC 3261, RFC 3264, RFC 5245
- Website: jdrosen.net

Jonathan Rosenberg (born 1972 or 1973) is a technologist noted for his work in IP communications. Network World has referred to him as "a pioneer [in] the development of the SIP protocol", and he was included in the 2002 TR35 list of the world's top under-35 innovators, as published by MIT Technology Review.

As of January 2019, Rosenberg is the chief technology officer and Head of A.I. at Five9, a cloud contact center provider. Prior to this, he was vice president and chief technology officer for Collaboration at Cisco, having previously worked as Skype's chief technology strategist.

Rosenberg is a longtime member of the IETF, where he has served in several leadership positions over his career. As of August 2017, he remains the 8th most prolific author of internet standards.

== Career ==
Rosenberg has worked in the VOIP field for over 20 years to date. He began working at Lucent Technologies in March 1993 as a Member of the Technical Staff. There, he led a small SIP research lab, acted as a team lead for DSP work, and conducted research in areas of wide area service discovery. It was during his time at Lucent that he received his PhD from Columbia University. In October 1999, Rosenberg left Lucent to serve as the chief technology officer of dynamicsoft. At dynamicsoft, Rosenberg conceived of, drove requirements for, designed, and lead software development for industry's first SIP application server. He also acted as architect and first product manager for dynamicsoft presence engine, conceived of, helped developed requirements for, and designed SIP firewall control proxy and co-developed the architecture for the dynamicsoft network application engine. When dynamicsoft was acquired by Cisco, Rosenberg followed the company. At Cisco, Rosenberg earned the rank of Cisco Fellow, the company's most senior technical position. He drove Cisco's Intercompany Media Engine (IME) product from concept through ship and set technology strategy for Cisco's service provider voice business. In 2009, Rosenberg left Cisco to serve as Chief Technology Strategist at Skype. At Skype, He pioneered the Facebook video calling integration, along with many other developments. In 2013, Rosenberg left Skype to return to his alma mater Cisco Systems, taking the position of CTO and Vice President of Cloud Collaboration. Shortly thereafter, he was promoted to CTO and Vice President of Collaboration.

In September 2018, Rosenberg reported that he is leaving Cisco. In January 2019, he followed his former Cisco Systems boss Rowan Trollope to Five9, joining the company as CTO and Head of A.I.

== Personal life ==
Jonathan Rosenberg lives in Freehold Township, New Jersey with his wife and two children.
