= XML Configuration Access Protocol =

The XML Configuration Access Protocol (XCAP) is an application layer protocol that allows a client to read, write, and modify application configuration data stored in XML format on a server.

== Overview ==
XCAP maps XML document sub-trees and element attributes to HTTP URIs, so that these components can be directly accessed by clients using HTTP protocol. An XCAP server is used by XCAP clients to store data like buddy lists and presence policy in combination with a SIP Presence server that supports PUBLISH, SUBSCRIBE and NOTIFY methods to provide a complete SIP SIMPLE server solution.

== Features ==
The following operations are supported via XCAP protocol in a client-server interaction:

- Retrieve an item
- Delete an item
- Modify an item
- Add an item

The operations above can be executed on the following items:

- Document
- Element
- Attribute

The XCAP addressing mechanism is based on XPath, that provides the ability to navigate around the XML tree.

== Application usages ==
The following applications are provided by XCAP, by using specific auid (Application Unique Id):

- XCAP capabilities (auid = xcap-caps).
- Resource lists (auid = resource-lists). A resource lists application is any application that needs access to a list of resources, identified by a URI, to which operations, such as subscriptions, can be applied.
- Presence rules (auid = pres-rules, org.openmobilealliance.pres-rules). A Presence Rules application is an application which uses authorization policies, also known as authorization rules, to specify what presence information can be given to which watchers, and when.
- RLS services (auid = rls-services). A Resource List Server (RLS) services application is Session Initiation Protocol (SIP) application whereby a server receives SIP SUBSCRIBE requests for resource, and generates subscriptions towards the resource list.
- PIDF manipulation (auid = pidf-manipulation). Pidf-manipulation application usage defines how XCAP is used to manipulate the contents of PIDF based presence documents.

== Standards ==
The XCAP protocol is based on the following IETF standards:

RFC 4825, 4826, 4827, 5025
