= Elastix =

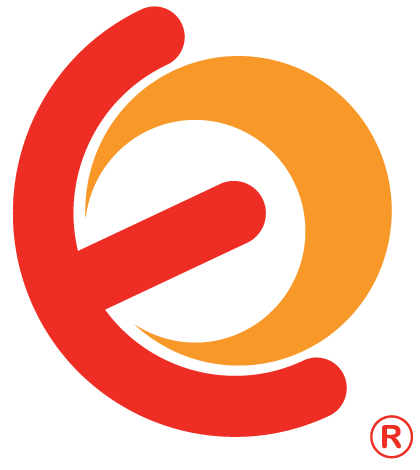
- Isotipo-elastix
- Developer: 3CX
- OS family: Linux
- Working state: Current
- Source model: Open source and Proprietary
- Latest release: 2.5 GPL (Stable), 5.0 Proprietary (Stable) / 11 February 2016; 10 years ago
- Kernel type: Monolithic (Linux)
- License: GNU General Public License(2.5) Proprietary (5.0)
- Official website: www.elastix.org

Elastix is a unified communications server software that combines IP PBX, email, IM, faxing and collaboration functionality. It has a Web interface and includes capabilities such as a call center software with predictive dialing.

The Elastix 2.5 functionality is based on open source projects including Asterisk, FreePBX, HylaFAX, Openfire and Postfix. Those packages offer the PBX, fax, instant messaging and email functions, respectively.

As of Elastix 5.0 all functionality is provided through 3CX, a software based private branch exchange (PBX) based on the SIP (Session Initiation Protocol) standard. It enables extensions to make calls via the public switched telephone network (PSTN) or via Voice over Internet Protocol (VoIP) services. Elastix 5.0 is an IP business phone system that supports standard SIP soft/hard phones, VoIP services and traditional PSTN phone lines.

Elastix 2.5 is free software, released under the GNU General Public License. Elastix 5.0 is Proprietary released under the terms of the 3CX license.

== Support for telephony hardware ==
Elastix 2.5 has a good support for telephony hardware. It includes drivers for the major manufacturers like Dinstar, OpenVox, Digium, Khomp, Sangoma Technologies Corporation, Rhino Equipment, Xorcom, and Yealink Network Technology. The most of these drivers are supported through the zaptel project or modified versions of it. Other drivers are supported by the mISDN project and other projects.

Elastix 2.5 also supports other phone brands thanks to the SIP and IAX protocols that Asterisk implements. These protocols are based on public available standards. For this reason any manufacturer can build a product that supports them. Some certified manufacturers are Ascom, Snom and Yealink.

== Call center module ==
Elastix 2.5 was the first distribution that included a call center module with a predictive dialer, released entirely as free software. This module can be installed from the same web-based Elastix interface through a module loader. The call center module can handle incoming and outgoing campaigns. It can also optionally be made more powerful by adding common third party modules like QueueMetrics and WombatDialer.

== History of the project ==
Elastix was created and maintained by PaloSanto Solutions, an Open Source support company based in Ecuador. Elastix was released to the public for the first time in March 2006. It was not a complete distribution but a Web interface for CDR (Call Detail Records) reporting. It was not until late December 2006 that Elastix was released as a Linux distribution with Asterisk, Zaptel and a number of other packages which were easily administrated via a user friendly Web interface that caught the community's attention.

The Elastix 2.5 Linux distribution is based on CentOS, which has binary compatibility with Red Hat Enterprise Linux.

From its initial release until now the Elastix distro has grown in popularity. The project was nominated for two straight years (2007 and 2008) as finalist in the SourceForge Community Choice Awards.

In 2016 the Elastix project was acquired by 3CX. With this acquisition the Elastix Distro versioned at 5.0 was switched to a proprietary software on top of Debian with the 3CX platform. Open-source forks of pre-version 5 Elastix are being maintained by the Issabel project.

== Similar software distributions ==
- Issabel – A project to maintain and advance an open-source fork of Elastix.
- FreePBX Distro – FreePBX's official distribution maintained by Sangoma Technologies Corporation
- PBX in a Flash – Originally used FreePBX, later versions use 3CX
- AsteriskNOW – Merged into FreePBX
- trixbox – Now end-of-life, uses forked version of FreePBX. Was maintained by Fonality.
