= Iristel =

Canadian telecommunication provider

Iristel Inc.
- Type: Private
- Industry: Telecommunications
- Founded: 1999
- Headquarters: Markham, Ontario, Canada
- Key people: Samer Bishay; President & CEO
- Number of employees: ~200
- Subsidiaries: Ice Wireless
- Website: iristel.com

Iristel is a Canadian provider of telecommunication services that is a competitive local exchange carrier (CLEC). The company was founded in 1999 and is headquartered in Markham, Ontario. It provides a range of communication services, including Voice-over-IP (VoIP), wireless solutions, and toll-free services. The company's network spans Canada and serves customers in over 70 countries.

Iristel has deployed multiple redundant switching facilities and points of presence (PoPs) nationally.

== History ==
Iristel was established in 1999 by Samer Bishay., initially focusing on VoIP services. The company was granted a carrier license by the Canadian Radio-Television Commission in 2004, allowing it to provide local phone services. Over the years, the company expanded its offerings and network infrastructure, becoming one of Canada's larger independent telecommunications providers.

Iristel’s company site lists offices in the Canadian cities of Markham Ontario, Montreal Quebec, Matane Québec and Gaspe, as well as offices in USA, Romania, Moldova, Kenya, and Norway.

Iristel launched its High Definition (HD) VoIP Telephone Service in February 2007. By May 2007, the company added Domestic and Global SIP Trunking and Hosted PBX to their enterprise VoIP services. Later in December 2007, Iristel began to offer dual mode Wi-Fi-enabled GSM to mobile phones.

In June 2008, Iristel began offering Iristel IP Mobility, a wireless IP service that combines VoIP over Wi-Fi/GSM, Single Number Reach and Fixed Mobile Convergence.

Iristel IP Mobility provides users with a single point of contact for fixed, mobile, and Wi-Fi calls. Users have a single phone number for both inbound and outbound calling across multiple devices. They can also switch calls back and forth between the mobile network and the VoIP network, without interruption to reduce cellular charges. Settings are configurable through an online portal. In February 2009, MTS Allstream, a wholly owned subsidiary of Manitoba Telecom Services Inc. and a communication solutions provider in Canada, chose Iristel to convert its Time-division multiplexing (TDM) voice traffic to Internet Protocol (IP).

Iristel has performed various interoperability tests with these VoIP hardware & software manufacturers: Polycom, Mediatrix, Avaya, Grandstream, Toshiba, 3CX Phone System, Snom and Yealink Network Technology.

In 2023, the company expanded its services to Kenya.

== Acquisitions and partnerships ==
In May 2012, Iristel became a major shareholder in Ice Wireless, a mobile network operator serving northern Canada. In September, Iristel and Ice Wireless partnered with Huawei Canada to launch a 3G network across the three territories.

In 2017, the company partnered with Kepler Communications to provide satellite-based Internet of Things (IoT) connectivity in isolated areas. In October 2018, Iristel purchased Telecommunications de l'est (TDE), a company located in Eastern Quebec, which it integrated with ImobileCa, a subsidiary that Iristel acquired in May 2018. The latter had a non-operating cellular license in eastern Quebec.

== Operations ==
Iristel operates a telecommunications network with multiple PoPs across Canada, supporting voice and data services for businesses and consumers. The company provides VoIP infrastructure, including wholesale voice services, enterprise telephony, and residential communication solutions.

Through its subsidiary Ice Wireless, Iristel provides telecommunications services in northern Canada, including the Yukon, Northwest Territories, and Nunavut. Ice Wireless operates a 4G/LTE network and offers broadband internet in these regions.

Internationally, Iristel operates in over 70 countries, offering services such as global voice termination, international Direct Inward Dialing (DID) numbers, and Mobile Virtual Network Operator (MVNO) solutions. The company maintains interconnections with multiple Tier 1 carriers.

Iristel provides core telecommunications services while also specializing in VoIP security and cloud-based communications.

== Dispute with Telus ==
In 2018, Iristel and Telus were involved in a dispute regarding call routing to Iristel's Ice Wireless customers. Iristel accused Telus of blocking calls, while Telus alleged that Iristel engaged in traffic simulation using Northern Canada's 867 area code. The Canadian Radio-television and Telecommunications Commission (CRTC) ruled that both companies had engaged in improper practices. The CRTC determined that Iristel gained an undue advantage through its practices, while Telus was found to have unjustly discriminated against Iristel by limiting call capacity. As a result, the CRTC reduced Iristel's termination rate and sought public input on potential penalties for both companies.

== Tax fraud controversy ==
An article by the CBC states that "In early 2020, the Canada Revenue Agency came to believe it had made a $63-million mistake." The CRA alleged that Iristel was part of a carousel scheme—a tax scam in which participants pass goods around in a circle of companies, failing to pay sales tax when the goods are imported but collecting a tax refund on the export. This scheme was alleged in a Fifth Estate report.

In 2022, Iris Technologies Inc. (Iristel) filed a $250-million lawsuit in Federal Court against the Canada Revenue Agency (CRA) and four of its agents, alleging misrepresentation, misfeasance in public office, abuse of process, and negligence.

== See also ==
- Voice over Internet Protocol
- List of Canadian telephone companies
