= Avaya IP Phone 1140E =

IP phone

Avaya IP Phone /1140E
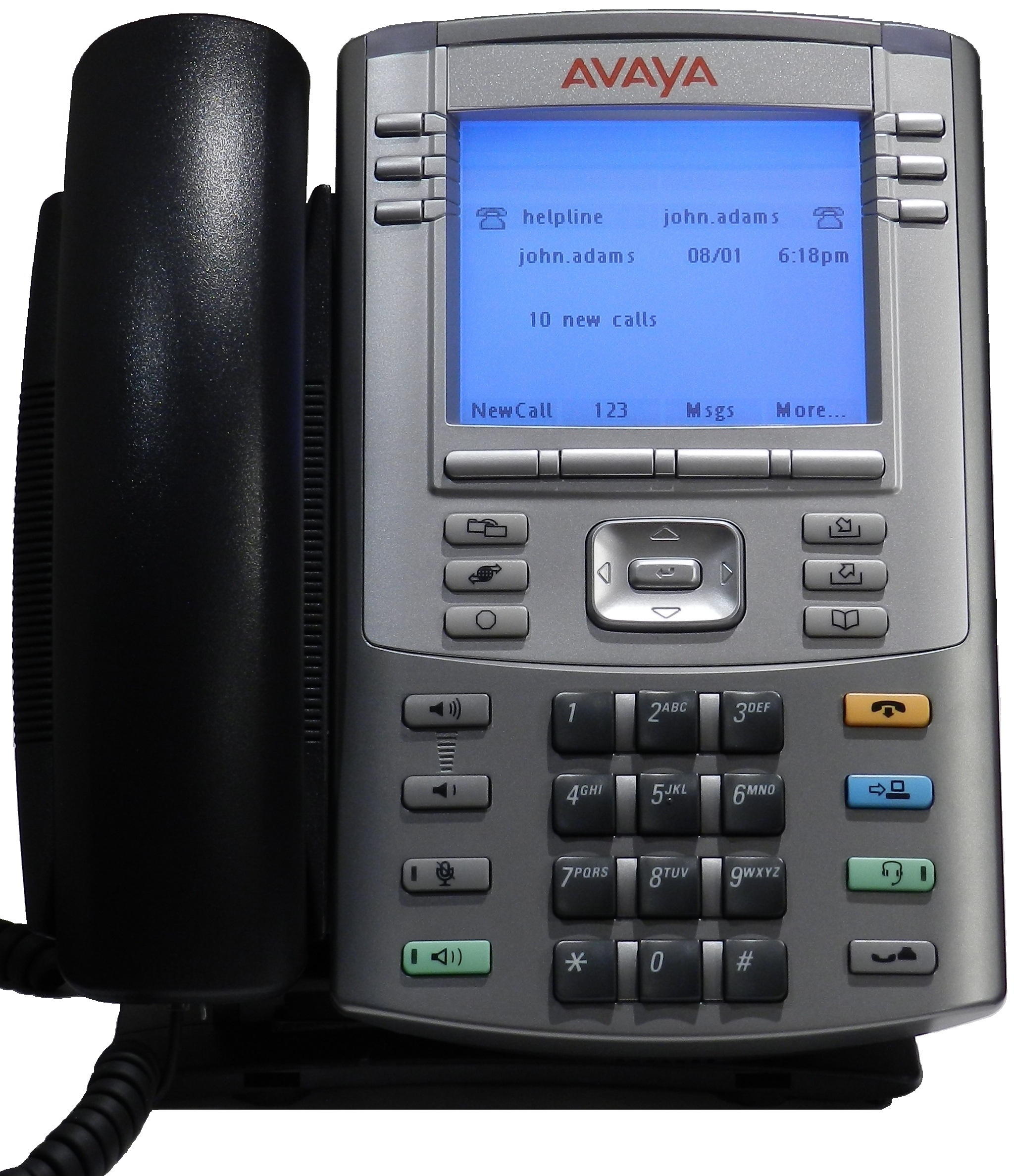
- Manufacturer: Avaya
- Type: Telephone
- Released: 2008

Avaya IP Phone 1140E in telecommunications is a desktop Internet Protocol client from 1100-series manufactured by Avaya for unified communications. The phone can operate on the Session Initiation Protocol (SIP) or UNIStim protocols. The SIP firmware supports presence selection and notification along with secure instant messaging. This device has an integrated 10/100/1000BASE-T auto-sensing Ethernet switch with two ports and an integrated USB port, and is Bluetooth capable. The SIP version of this phone has full IPv6 functionality and only requires 2.9 watts of power.

== Notable awards and installations ==
In 2005, this device won Best of Internet Telephony during the Interop Conference & Expo in Los Angeles, California.

Starting in 2008 with the wedge 4 renovation project, all the phones in The Pentagon (the world's largest office building) were to be replaced with voice over IP phones, principally the 1140E. One of the quoted reasons was that the phone was "green" (environmentally friendly).

In 2008 because of the very low power consumption of these devices, this phone was the IP device of choice contributing to the Palazzo Las Vegas getting recognized as the largest 'green' building in the world with a Silver LEED (Leadership in Energy and Environmental Design) certificate from the U.S. Green Building Council.

During the 2010 Winter Olympics games, 15,000 of these phones were used to support the 1.8 million live spectators.

== History ==
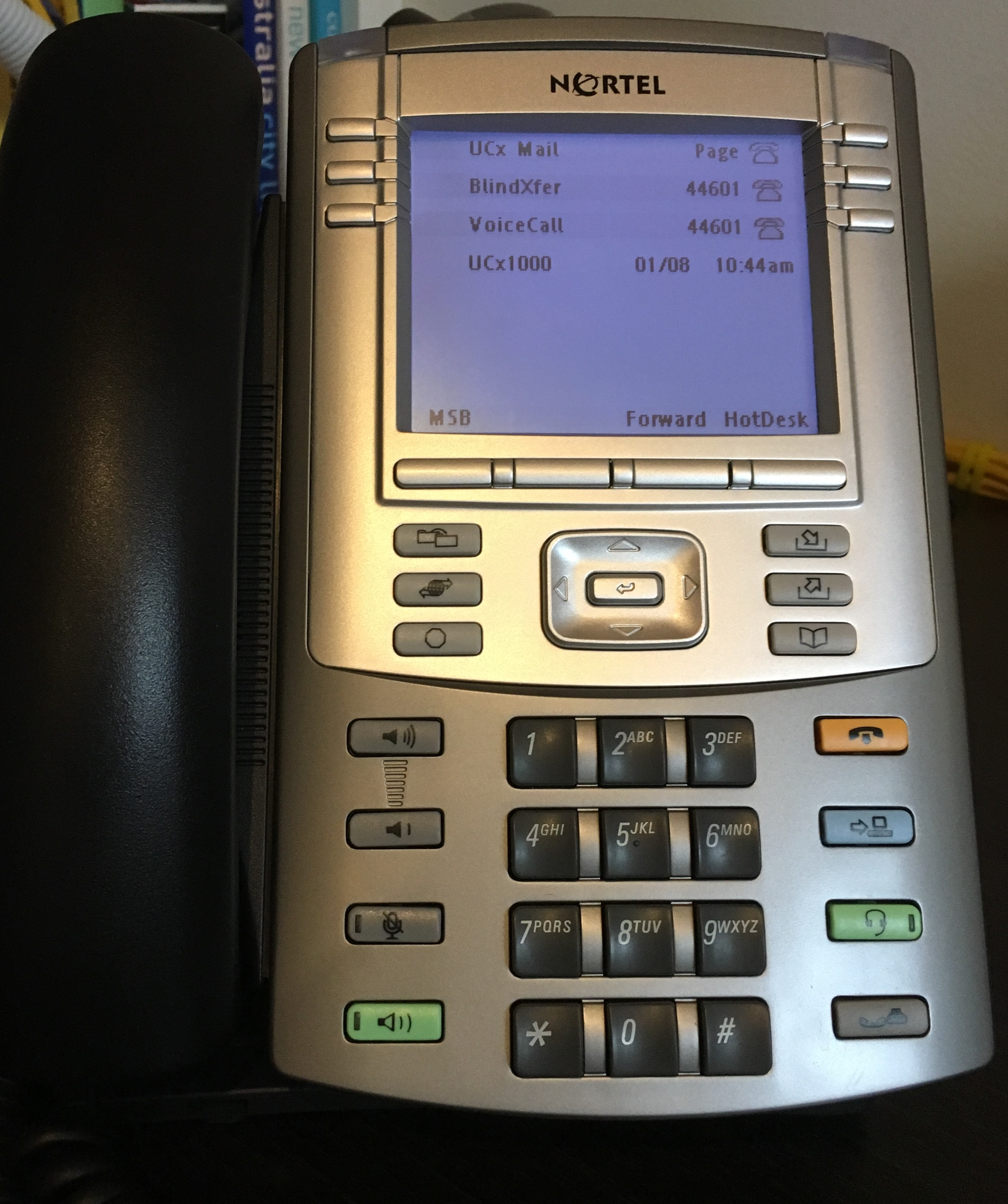
Earlier Nortel version

The 1100 series of phones was originally manufactured in 2008 as an evolution of the 2004 IP phone series phones from Nortel. As such it began as a UNIStim only phone which meant that the phone was primarily supported with only Nortel manufactured voice PBX systems.

In 2009 a firmware upgrade was made available to allow the phone to function on the SIP protocol. This meant that the phone could now be used with a wide variety of PBX systems including those produced by Nortel, Avaya and even open source PBX systems such as the Asterisk operating system.

In 2010 a VPN client was added to the firmware as of release 0623C7F. A remote worker location with a broadband Internet connection can use the phone's VPN capability to securely establish an IP tunnel back to the corporate network, extending a standard voice telephone extension to any location on the Internet. Other users in the global corporation can dial the user's extension as if it were on the local network.

== See also ==
- Avaya 1100-series IP phones
- Avaya Government Solutions
- LG-Nortel IP Phone 8540
- Application Server 5300 (AS5300)
- Microsoft Office Communications Server
- Microsoft Office Communicator
