= FreePBX Distro =

Software system

- Developer: Sangoma Technologies Corporation
- Final release: SNG7-PBX16-64bit-2302-1 / February 2023 (2 years ago)
- Operating system: CentOS
- Predecessor: AsteriskNOW
- Available in: 22 languages
- List of languages Brazilian Portuguese, Bulgarian, Czech, Chinese, English (US), English (UK), French, German, Hebrew, Hungarian, Italian, Japanese, Persian, Dutch, Polish, Portuguese, Romanian, Russian, Spanish, Swedish, Ukrainian, Vietnamese
- Type: Voice over IP softswitch
- License: AGPL v3 and GPL v3
- Website: www.freepbx.org/downloads/

The FreePBX Distro was a freeware unified communications software system that consisted of FreePBX, a graphical user interface (GUI) for configuring, controlling and managing Asterisk PBX software. The FreePBX Distro included packages that offer VoIP, PBX, Fax, IVR, voice-mail and email functions.

The FreePBX Distro Linux distribution was based on CentOS, which maintains binary compatibility with Red Hat Enterprise Linux. FreePBX has contributed to the popularity of Asterisk.

As a result of CentOS Linux being discontinued and the last version of CentOS 7 going out of support on June 30, 2024, FreePBX 17 has moved over to and is supported on Debian Linux. FreePBX will no longer be providing a pre-configured FreePBX Distro, but will provide a script to install FreePBX on a fresh install of Debian Linux. In-place migration will not be possible, but will be possible by restoring a backup on the new version from the previous version.

As FreePBX 16 will be supported until the release of FreePBX 18, FreePBX on this distribution will still work and be supported, however, there will be no further support for the underlying operating system.

== Installation ==
The Official FreePBX Distro is installed from a ISO image available by web download, that includes the system CentOS, Asterisk, FreePBX GUI and assorted dependencies. This can then either be burned to DVD or written to a USB stick for installation

== Support for telephony hardware ==
The FreePBX Distro has built-in support for cards from multiple vendors, including Digium, OpenVox, Alto, Rhino Equipment, Xorcom and Sangoma.

The FreePBX Distro supports a large number of phone models via open-source modules. Supported VoIP phone manufacturers include Algo, AND, AudioCodes, Cisco, Cyberdata, Digium, Grandstream, Mitel/Aastra, Nortel/Avaya, Panasonic, Polycom, Sangoma, Snom, Xorcom and Yealink.

== Development ==
FreePBX made its debut in 2004 as the AMP project (Asterisk Management Portal). The FreePBX Distro was released in 2011 as an turnkey solution for building a PBX using Asterisk, CentOS and FreePBX.

FreePBX has over 1 million active production PBXs and over 20,000 new systems added each month.

The core telephony engine is Asterisk, as configured by the Open Source FreePBX GUI.

The last stable release is FreePBX Distro Stable SNG7-PBX16-64bit-2302-1 based on these main components:

- FreePBX 16
- CentOS 7.8
- Asterisk 16, 18, 19 (20 supported by upgrade once installed)
