= VoIP User =

- Company type: Non-profit
- Industry: Telecommunication
- Founded: 2003
- Founder: Dean Elwood, Tjardick van der Kraan
- Headquarters: London, United Kingdom
- Net income: 17889900
- Website: www.voipuser.org

VoIP User was a community-driven and financed SIP based VoIP network. The project's aim was to allow users to experiment with VoIP by providing opportunities to work with SIP and IAX2 devices.

== History ==
VoIP User was created by Dean Elwood and Tjardick van der Kraan in July 2003. The VoIP User website became unavailable in late 2011 due to a major data loss. Despite a short notice promising a rebuild it eventually failed to resolve to a destination in November 2012. However, as of December 2012, existing SIP accounts at sip.voipuser.org are still operational.

As of July 2023, the site is unavailable.

== Features ==
The VoIP User network was designed for a community environment, making it different from many other VoIP networks. One key distinction was that users could call PSTN phone numbers through VoIP User's PSTN gateway without call charges. This was possible because calls to VoIP User’s numbers generated a small revenue called the "termination charge", which was added to a community account. Outbound calls then used this accrued revenue. If users maintained a balance between incoming and outgoing calls, this account remained steady.

There was a limit on the routes through the VoIP User PSTN gateway, allowing only calls to countries that cost 2.5p/min or less. This primarily covered landlines, with some mobile phones included. Each call had a maximum duration of 10 minutes.

The call rates to different locations were determined by VoIP User’s PSTN line providers, causing fluctuations similar to those seen with commercial international telecommunication companies. These variations could be influenced by factors like currency exchange rates and commercial negotiations. Unlike commercial providers, VoIP User aimed to break even rather than profit, a concept termed "minute neutral".

Information on calls routed by the VoIP User network was available on their analytics page. Members could get a UK non-geographic phone number for free, which could be directed to any landline globally or specific VoIP devices.

VoIP User was a member of ITSPA, the self-regulating body for the VoIP industry. It complied with the UK number portability scheme.

== Technology ==
VoIP User supported Session Initiation Protocol (SIP) for both incoming and outgoing calls and IAX2 protocol for incoming calls. It also supported SIP SIMPLE for Instant Messaging and Presence.

A wide variety of customer equipment was used on the VoIP User network including desktop VoIP phones, softphones, mobile phones (using Fring on the Apple iPhone and Windows Mobile devices and in-built Wi-Fi functionality in Nokia E series), ATAs and open source switches and PBXes like FreeSWITCH and Asterisk. VoIP User enabled these devices to be mapped to UK non-geographic numbers (typically 0844 or 0870) that have a per minute call rate low enough to fit in with VoIP User’s mode of operation. As an experimental network, several software vendors and private authors tested their SIP devices using the VoIP User network. By January 2009, there were over 250 SIP User-Agents known to VoIP User.

In 2012, the iNum initiative was launched, creating a +883 country code (dubbed "Earth Area Code") that was intended to route calls for free (on-net) or low cost (from PSTN) irrespective of geographic location of the caller and callee. VoIP User was one of the handful of organisations signed up to this from the outset.
