= Issabel =

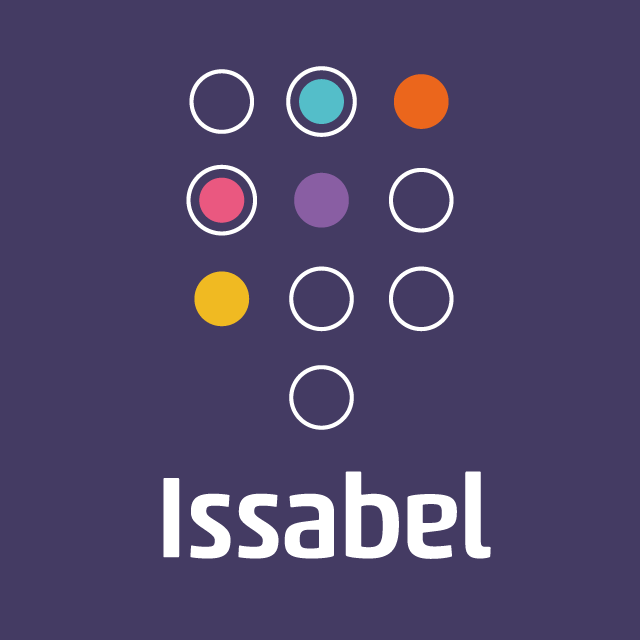
- Isotipo-elastix
- Written in: PHP
- Working state: In development
- Source model: Open source
- Latest release: 5.0
- Available in: English, Spanish
- Update method: YUM, ISO
- Supported platforms: IA-32, x86-64
- License: GPL
- Official website: www.issabel.org

Issabel is open-source unified communications PBX software, providing user-friendly web-based configuration, management, and reporting for telephony. Modules providing predictive dialing can be added. It is a fork of the open-source versions of Elastix, developed by the user/developer community when 3CX acquired Elastix, closed the community, halted distribution and development of the open-source versions, and released a proprietary version.

Issabel is based upon open-source versions of Elastix, Asterisk, FreePBX, HylaFAX, Openfire and Postfix and provides PBX, fax, instant messaging and e-mail server functionality.

Issabel is open-source software licensed under the GNU General Public License.
