= Bicom Systems =

- Developer: Bicom Systems
- Release: 2004; 22 years ago
- Stable release: Version 6.4.0 / September 22, 2021; 4 years ago
- Written in: C++
- Operating system: Microsoft Windows; OS X; Linux; iOS; Android OS
- Type: Voice over Internet Protocol
- License: Proprietary
- Website: www.bicomsystems.com

Bicom Systems is a producer and vendor of Asterisk (PBX)-based unified communications devices for VoIP businesses. Bicom Systems uses open standards telephony. Products include all of the software and hardware components involved in building a VoIP business or ITSP.

== History ==
Bicom Systems began researching and creating telecoms management software in 2003. An Asterisk pioneer, Bicom Systems launched the first ever open standards turnkey telephony system in 2004.

Bicom Systems has seven products including a desktop and mobile softphone, an IP PBX telephony platform, and an IP Key Systems product. Supported hardware manufacturers include Polycom, Yealink Network Technology, and others.

== See also ==
- Comparison of VoIP software
- List of SIP software
- IP PBX
