= Avaya 1100-series IP phones =

The 1100-series IP phones are 6 different desktop IP clients manufactured by Avaya for Unified communications which can operate on the SIP or UNIStim protocols. The SIP Firmware supports presence selection and notification along with secure instant messaging.

== History ==
The 1100 series of phones was originally manufactured in 2008 as an evolution of the IP Phone 2004 series of phones from Nortel. As such it began as a UNIStim-only phone, which meant that the phone was primarily supported with only Nortel manufactured voice PBX systems.

In 2009, a firmware upgrade was made available to allow the phone to function on the SIP protocol. This meant that the phone could now be used with a wide variety of PBX systems including those produced by Nortel, Avaya, and even open-source PBX systems such as Asterisk (PBX).

In 2010, a VPN client was added to the firmware as of release 0623C7F. This means that it is very easy to send the phone to a remote worker location with a typical cable modem or DSL Internet connection and the phone will use the VPN capability to securely establish an IP tunnel back to the corporate network and extend a standard voice telephone extension to any location on the Internet. Other users in the global corporation can dial the user's extension and the phone will ring.

== Models ==
=== 1110 ===
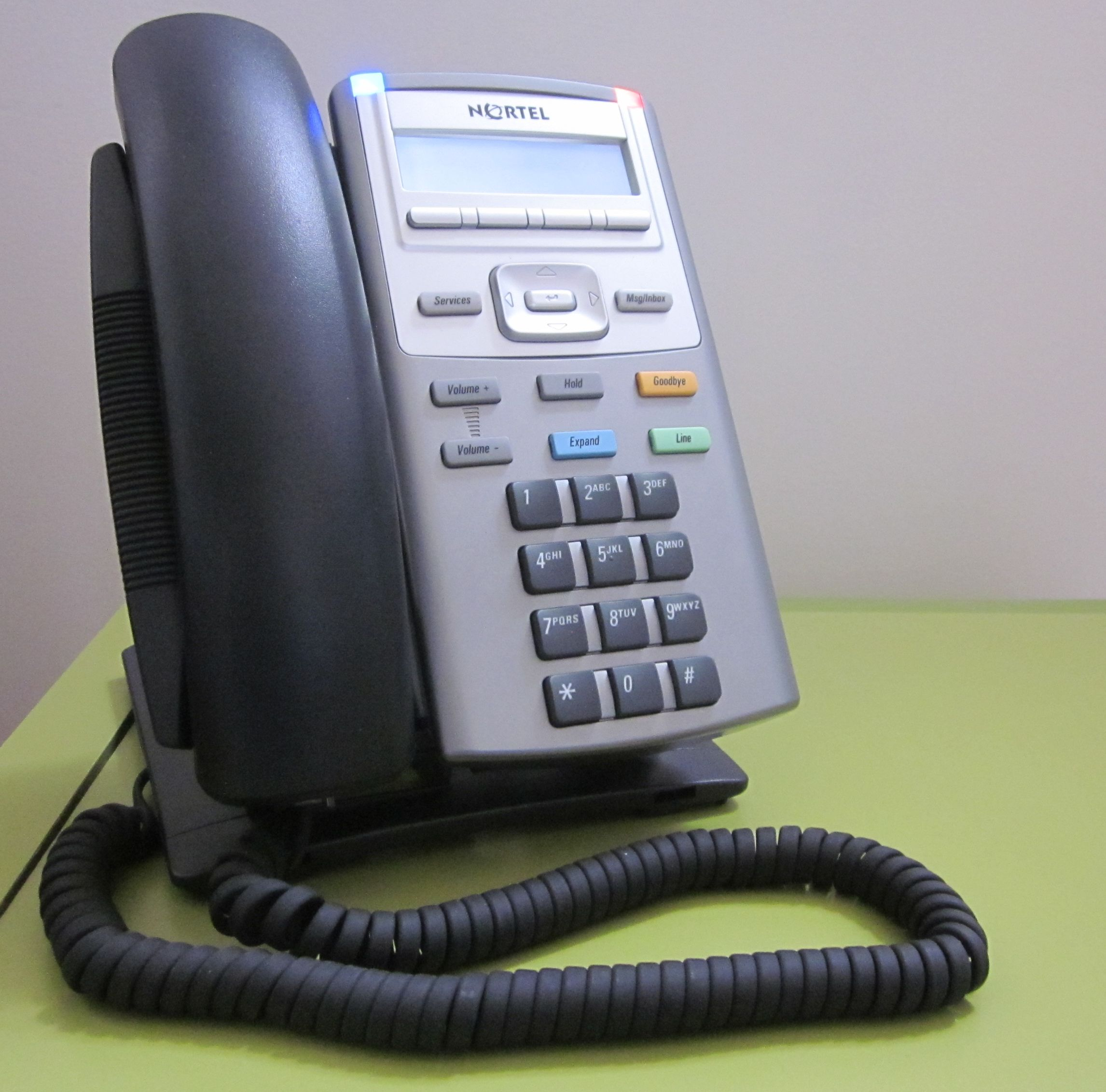
IP Phone 1110

The 1110 supports a single telephone line and is used for lobby and conference center locations, with a fully backlit monochrome display of 143 x 32 pixels. This phone has a two-port 10/100 Ethernet switch.

=== 1120E ===
This phone is a four-line phone with gigabit Ethernet ports, and a 240 x 160 pixel display. This device has a USB port and Bluetooth ability but in contrast its sister the 1120SA does not have these functioning USB or Bluetooth for security reasons.

=== 1120SA ===
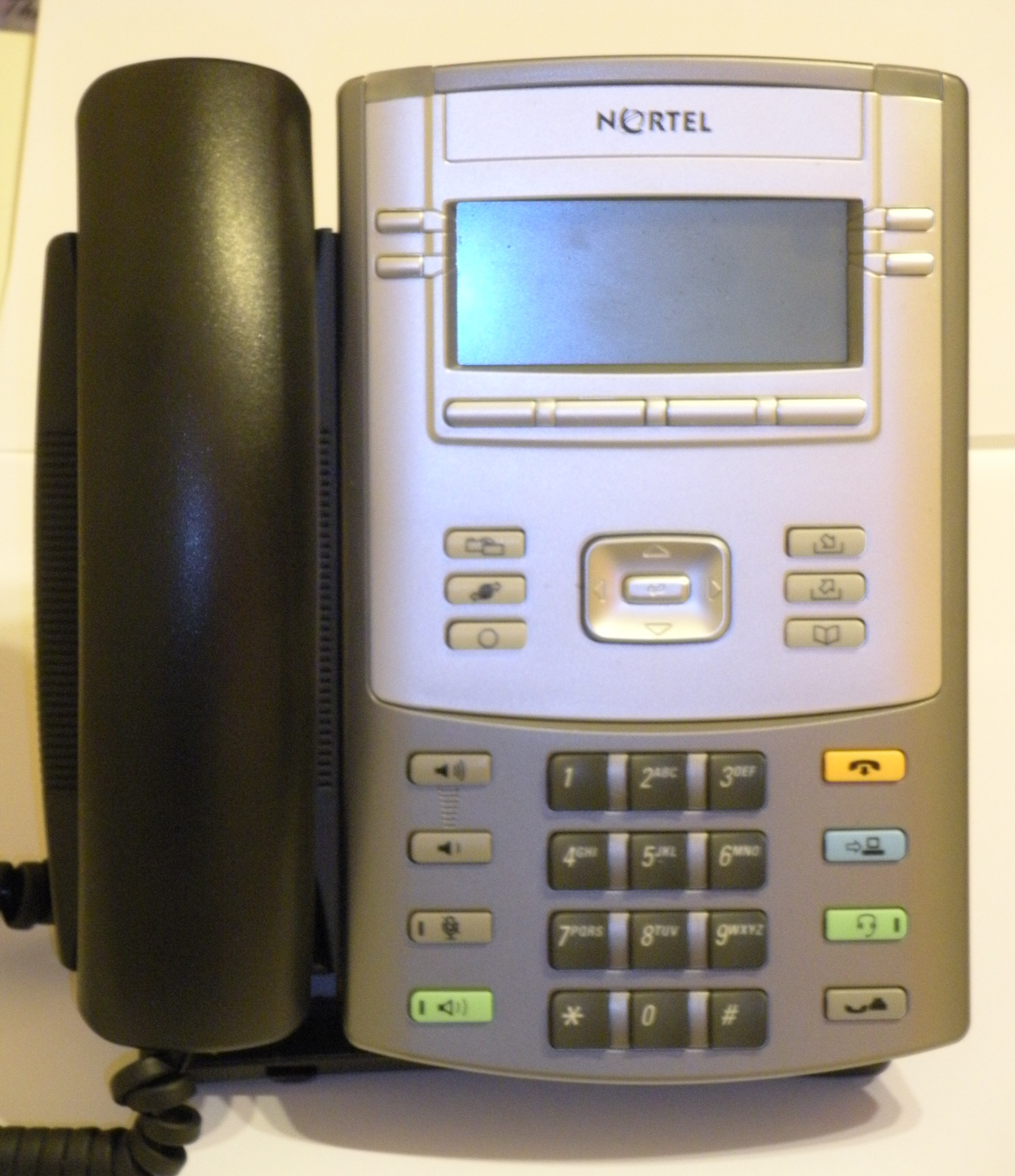
1120SA IP phone

The 1120SA is a special-use phone which is certified for use by Sensitive Compartmented Information Facilities (SCIF) users, without an external device.

The National Telecommunications Security Working Group (NTSWG) has approved the Avaya IP Phone 1120SA for deployment under the Director of Central Intelligence Directive (DCID 6/9), for VoIP and VoSIP (TSG-6 Type-acceptance CNSS Class-A and Class-B Certified).

==== Unique security features ====
The major security functions are:

- Positive disconnect
- Off-hook visual indicator
- Tamper-evident labeling
- No hands-free microphone
- Signaling encryption, media encryption and user-based authentication (network access control)
- Lockable tools menu -
- VPN-capable IP phone

=== 1140E ===
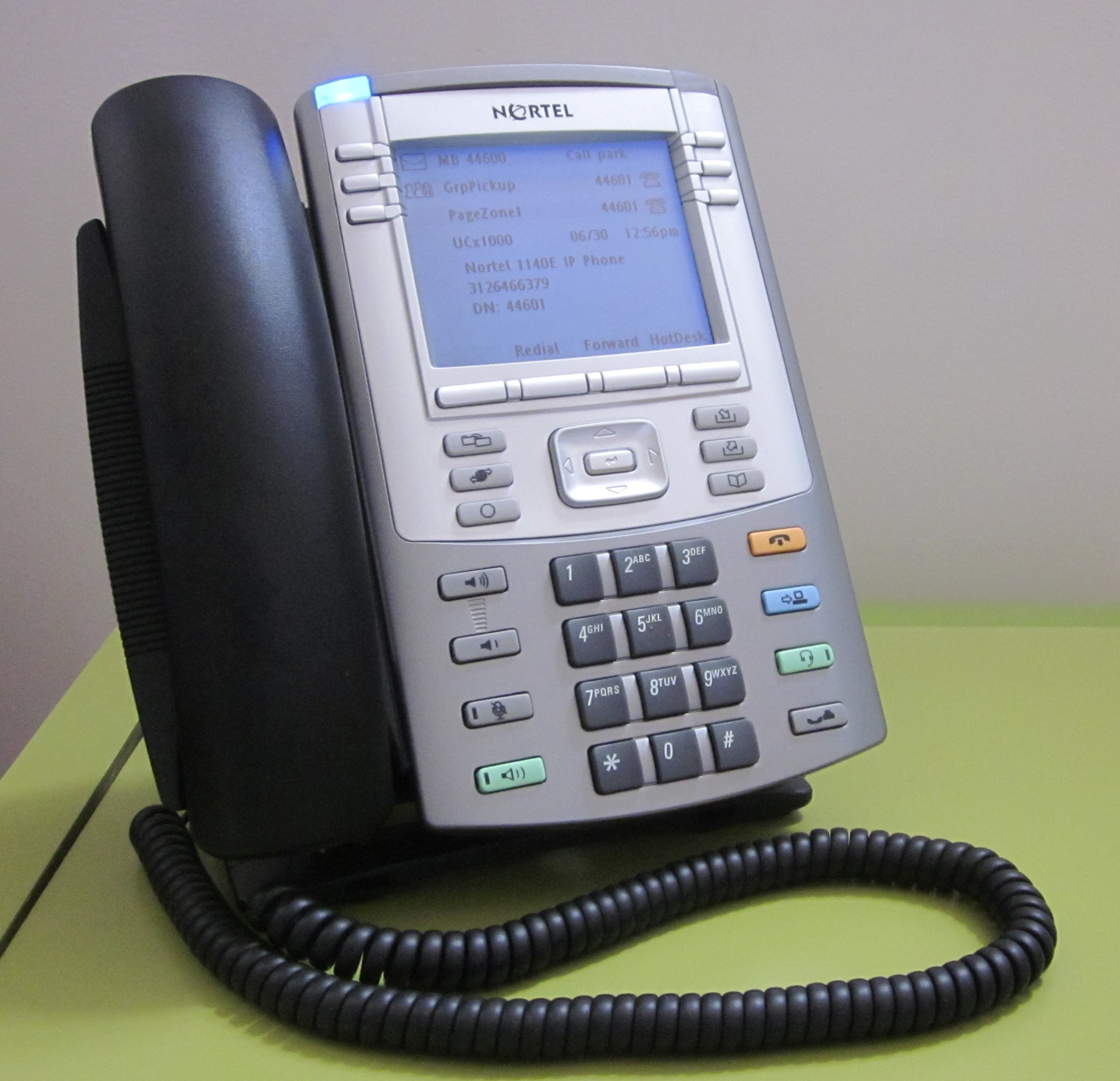
IP Phone 1140E

- VPN-capable IP phone

=== 1150E ===
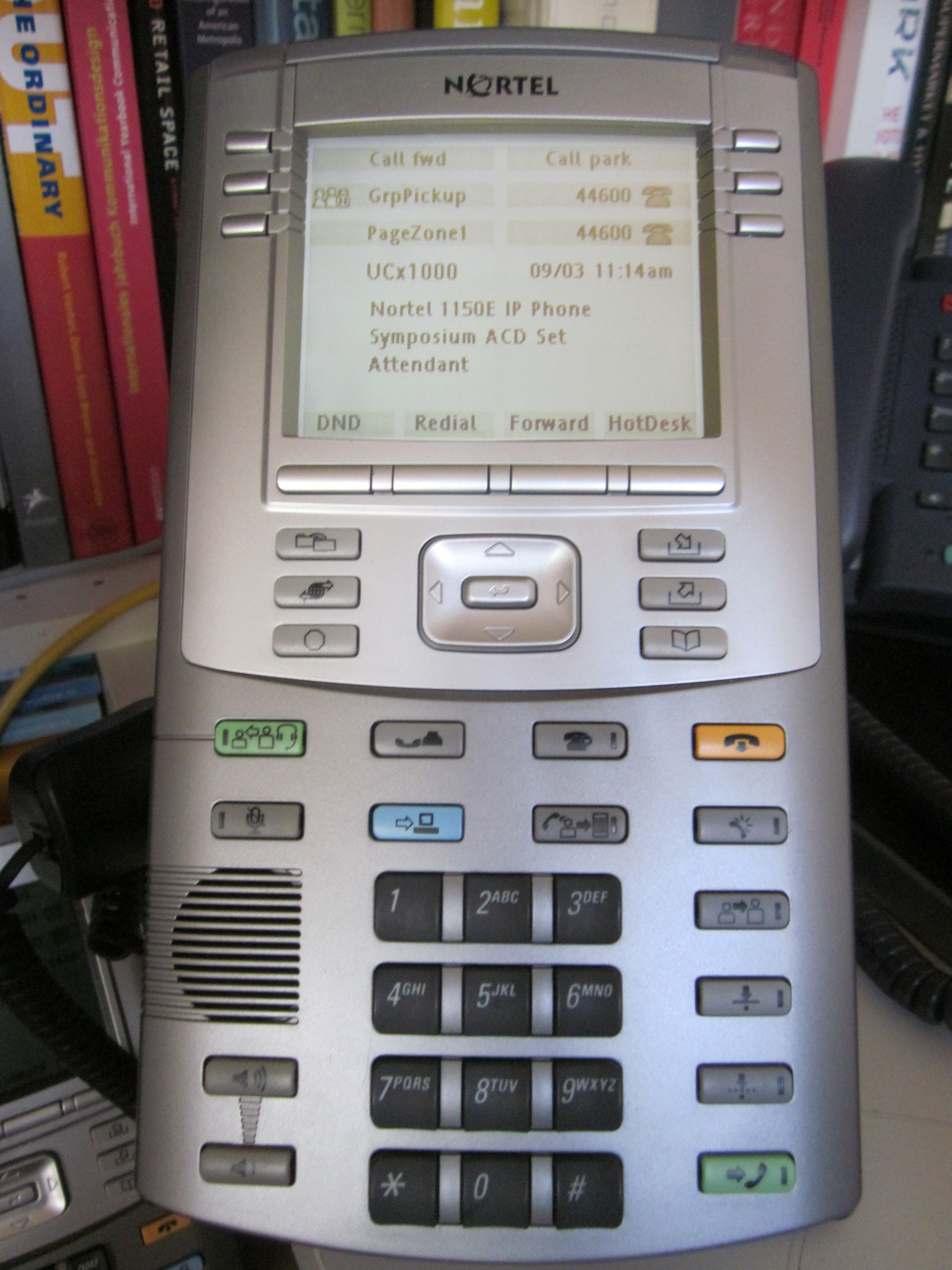
IP Phone 1150E

This phone can support up to 12 phone lines and 12 programmable soft keys, and seven additional fixed keys for agents (In-Calls, Not Ready, Make Set Busy, Supervisor, Supervisor Listen/Talk, Emergency and Activity). This IP ACD and contact center phone with a 240 x 160 pixel display, integrates two gigabit Ethernet ports. It also integrates Bluetooth and USB, to support wired and wireless mouse, keyboard, card readers, headsets, and flash memory drive devices.

- VPN-capable IP phone

=== 1165E ===
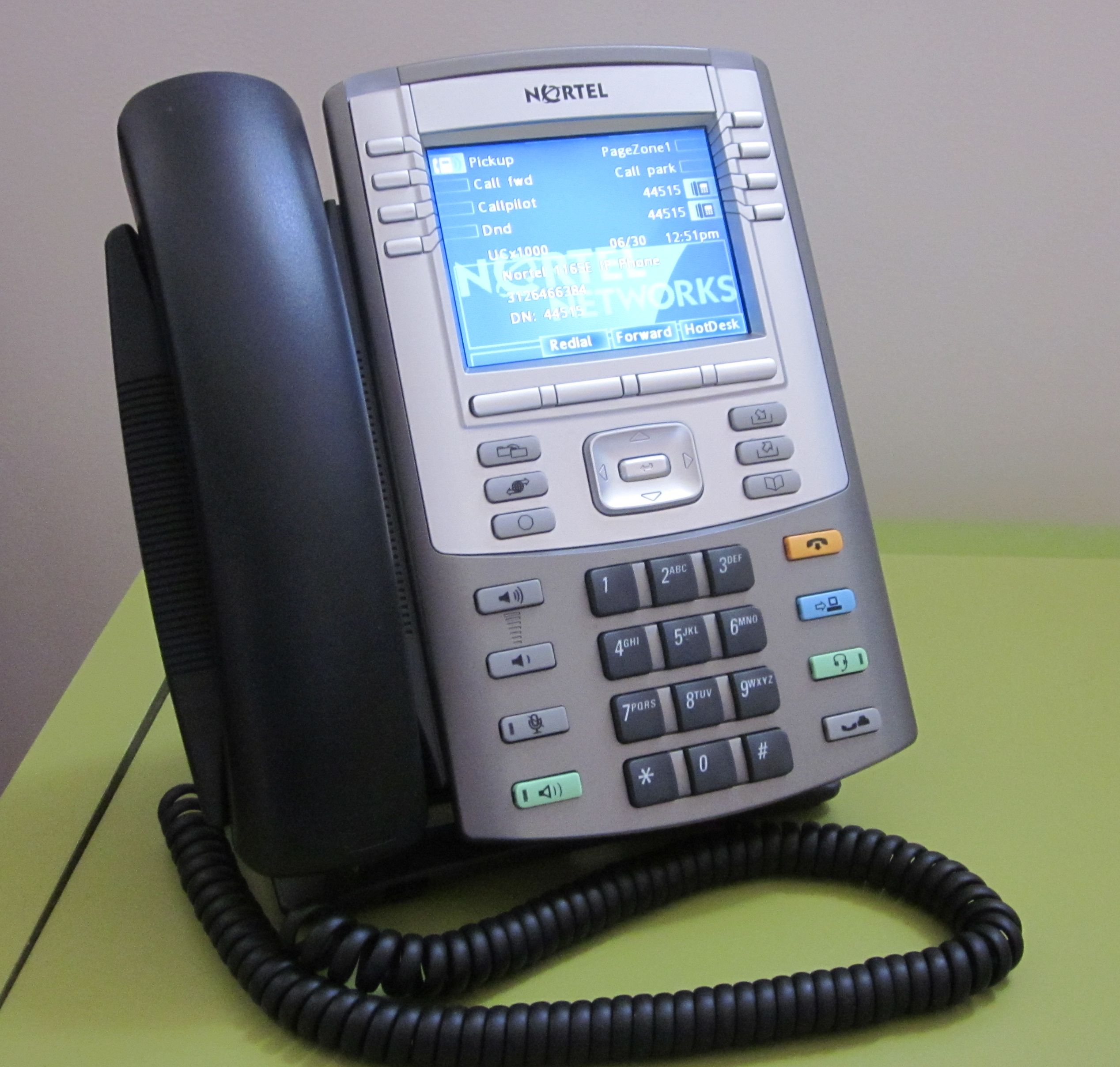
IP Phone 1165E

The phone can support up to sixteen lines through the UNIStim or Session Initiation Protocol (SIP) protocols. The display is a color QVGA resolution (320 x 240 pixels) LCD, with the option to have multiple themes, background images, or digital pictures. For additional security and privacy all traffic is encrypted, for both voice and signaling. The integrated Bluetooth and USB ports support wired and wireless mouse, keyboard, card readers, headsets, and flash memory drive devices. The phone has two gigabit Ethernet switch ports, and is powered through an IEEE 802.3af PoE device or can use a local power adapter.

==== Unique features ====
- Four soft keys
- Seven specialized feature keys: Quit, Directory, Message/Inbox, Shift/Outbox, Services, Copy, Expand.
- Supports the WML Browser

=== 1100 expansion module ===
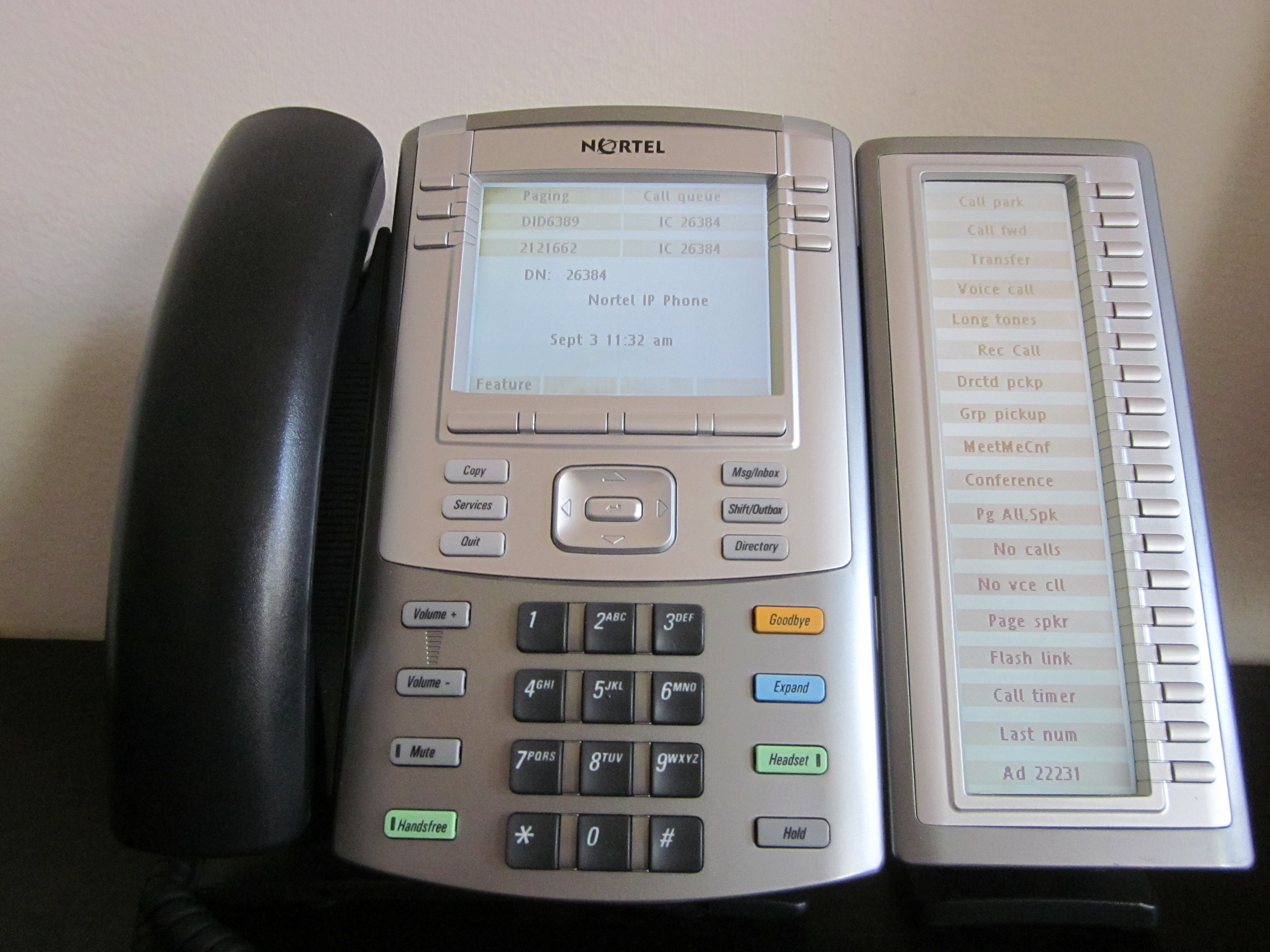
11xx KEM Module

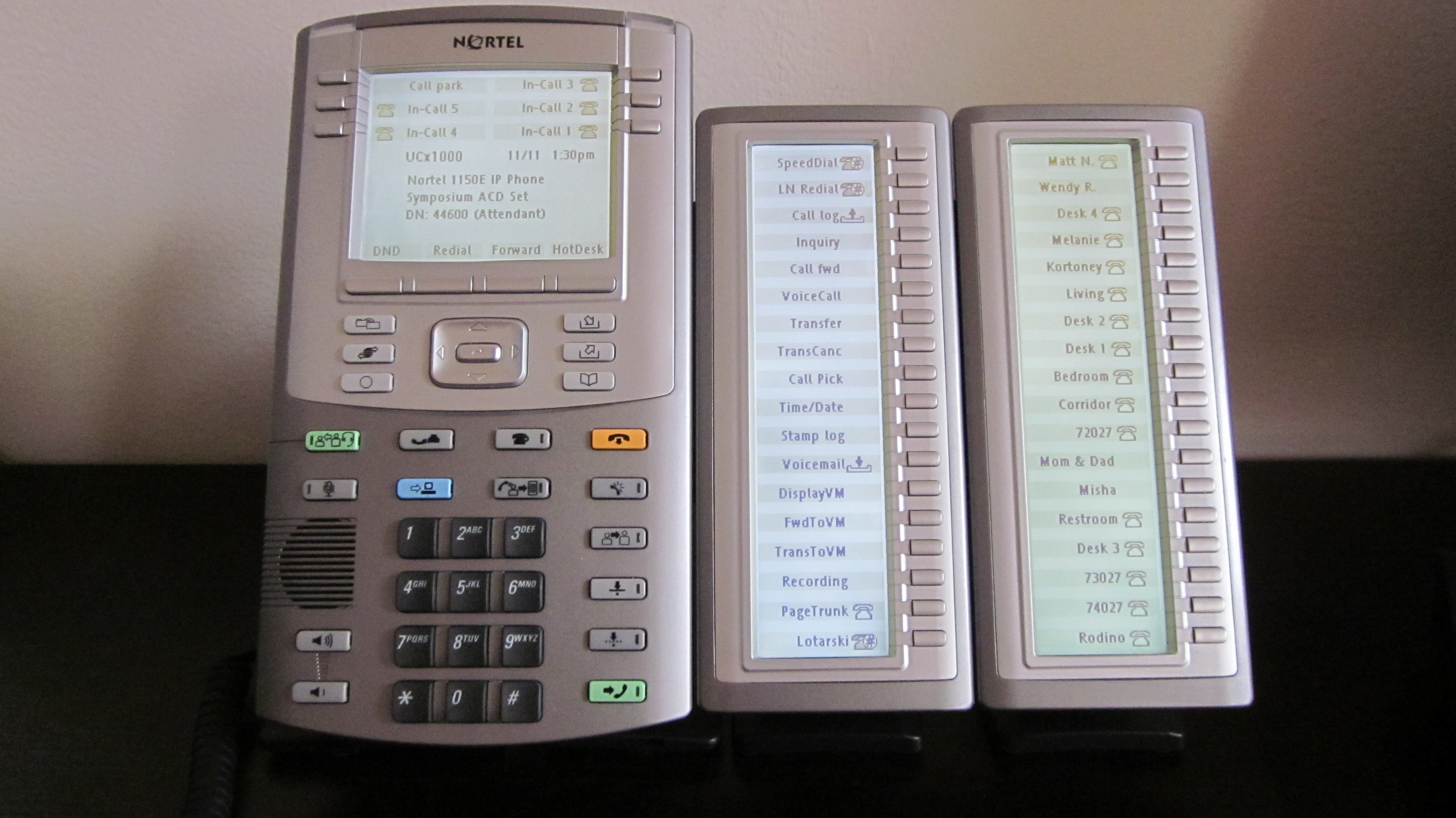
1150E KEM Attendant Console

Is an expansion module that may be installed on the 1120E, 1140E, or the 1150E phones. It extends the phones ability to support 18 telephone lines and has 18 programmable feature keys.

== Additional information ==
=== Summary of supported protocols ===
- Session Initiation Protocol
- UNIStim
- 802.1X and EAP (MD-5)
- Signaling Encryption (AES - 128bit)
- Media Encryption
- 802.1ab Link Layer Discovery Protocol (LLDP)
- 802.3af PoE
- PVQM (Proactive Voice Quality Monitoring)

=== PBX platform compatibility ===
- Avaya CS 1000
- AS5300
- BCM 400 (release 4.0 onwards)
- BCM 450
- BCM 50 (release 3.0 onwards)
- Asterisk and Trixbox
- E-Metrotel UCx20, UCx50, UCx450, UCx1000 IP Call Servers
- Pure SIP platform from SIP providers

== See also ==
- Avaya Government Solutions
- Avaya Aura Application Server 5300 (AS5300)
