= Trixbox =

trixbox
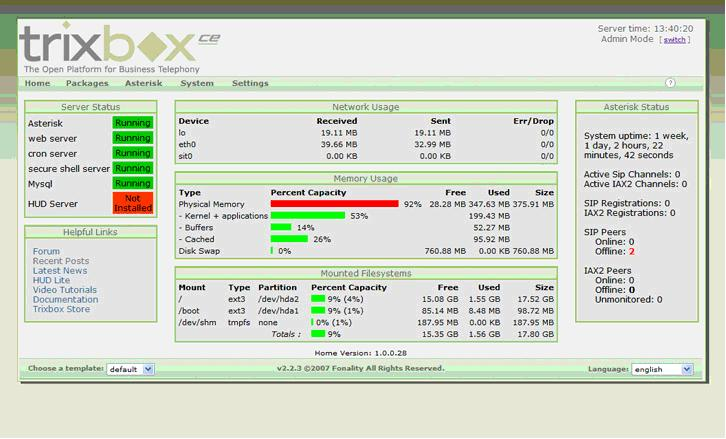
- Screenshot
- Developer(s): Fonality
- Operating system: Unix-like
- Available in: English
- License: GPLv2 or proprietary
- Website: www.trixbox.com www.trixbox.org

trixbox (formerly Asterisk@Home) was a software PBX based on Asterisk.

trixbox was initially released under the name Asterisk@Home. In October 2006 it was renamed to trixbox after Digium requested that its developers cease the use of the word "Asterisk"; the renaming was further justified by the fact that the product at that time consisted of much more than just Asterisk.

== Versions ==
=== trixbox CE (end of life) ===
trixbox CE, the community edition founded by Kerry Garrison and Andrew Gillis, was completely free and was available under a GPLv2 license. It has been downloaded more than any other Asterisk-based PBX system according to SourceForge, with over two million downloads as of August 22, 2009.

trixbox CE was last updated with a beta release, and shortly after a blog post was made by Andrew Gillis, founder & leader of development stating he was leaving.

In October 2012, Fonality announced that they would no longer support or update trixbox CE, and would instead focus on trixbox Pro.

The FreePBX Project announced the availability of scripts to convert existing end of life trixbox CE systems to a current version of FreePBX, an open source PBX platform with ongoing support and development.

=== trixbox Pro ===
trixbox Pro is the commercial version trixbox. Unlike the community edition it contains components for which the source code is not available. These extra components are geared towards making the software better able to fulfill the needs of larger companies and call centers.

=== trixbox Appliance ===
trixbox Appliance is a server appliance available from Fonality which comes preloaded with either trixbox CE or trixbox Pro.

== Core technologies ==
trixbox CE's core technologies include:

- CentOS - The Linux distribution on which trixbox is built.
- Asterisk - Provides the core PBX functionality.
- FreePBX - Provides a web interface for managing and configuring Asterisk through a web browser.
- Flash Operator Panel (FOP) - Provides a graphical overview of current calls and provides controls to operators. This is created with Adobe Flash and is accessed via a web browser.

== Similar software distributions ==
- FreePBX Distro - Officially maintained Distro of the FreePBX Project
- AsteriskNOW - Uses FreePBX GUI Maintained by Digium
- Elastix - Maintained by PaloSanto Solutions based in Ecuador. Uses Forked version of FreePBX GUI
- PBX in a Flash - Uses FreePBX maintained by PBX in a Flash Development Team
