= USB phone =

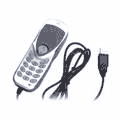
USB phone

A USB phone looks like a traditional telephone, but it has a USB connector instead of an RJ-11. It may be used with most softphones and services like Sipnet, Sippoint Mini, Net2Phone, NetMeeting, and Xlite.

In 2005 XS4ALL Internet BV (the first public internet provider in the Netherlands) supplied all of its DSL users with a USB VOIP Phone, it being the idea of Donar Alofs and built by Philips. It came with a browser plugin and people could make and receive calls via this USB Phone via an internet website (webphone.xs4all.nl). Later on, people got DSL modems with RJ-11 VoIP ports and RJ-45 ISDN ports, later the DSL modem/routers also had a built-in DECT for making calls with traditional phones.

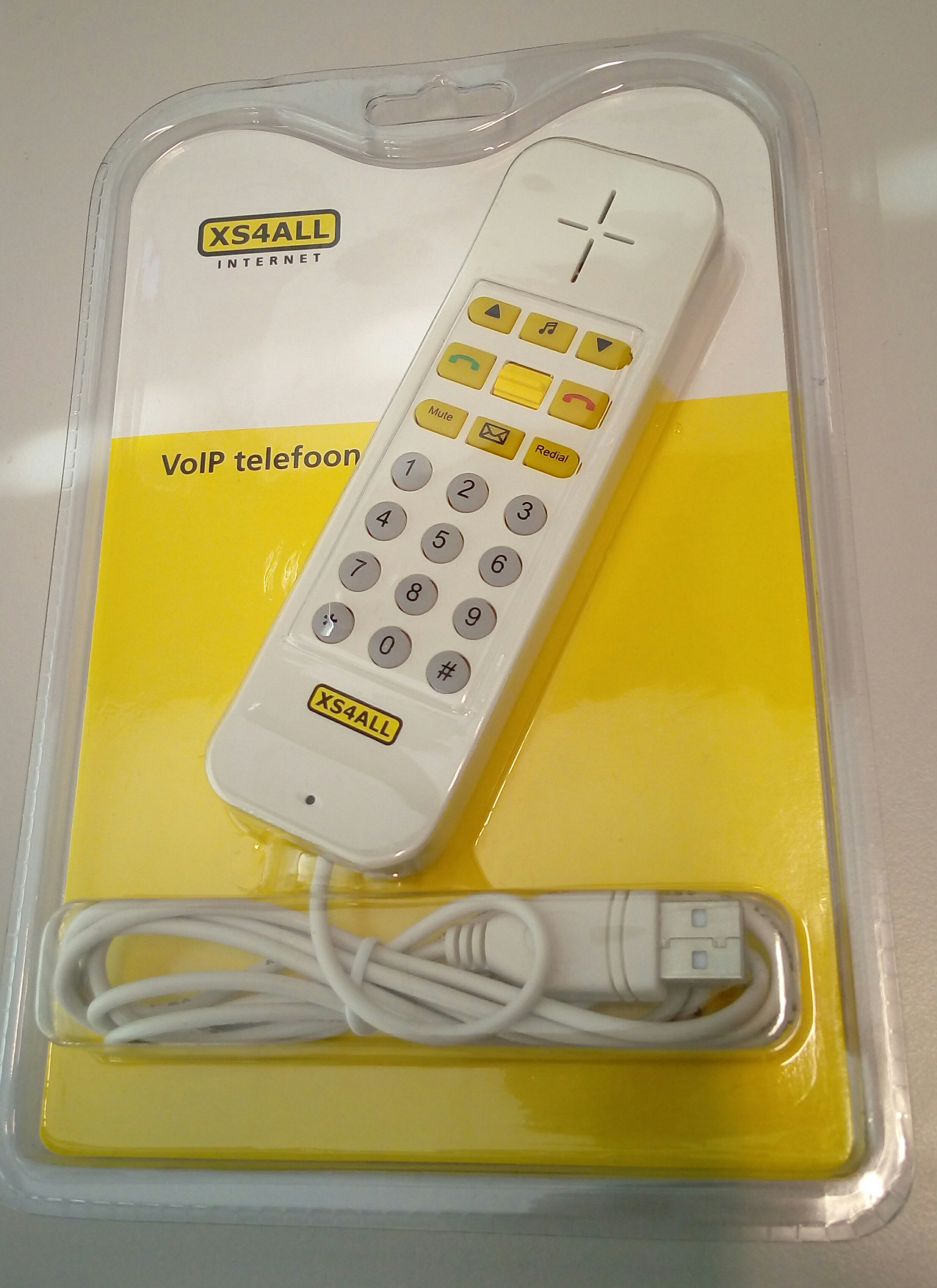
The first USB phone in the world

In 2009, Polycom introduced the CX300 USB phone, optimized for Microsoft Office Communications Server 2007 R2. In its second release (CX300 R2), this USB phone operates as a plug-and-play device with Skype for Business, Microsoft Lync 2013, and Microsoft Lync 2010. A user can communicate using the handset, plug in a headset (RJ9 plug in rear), or use it as a speakerphone when the handset is left on-hook. It is also supported with Skype for Business online which makes it a possible endpoint to use with Office 365 Cloud PBX when connected to a PC running the Skype for Business client.
