= Chatcord =

Device to connect a telephone to a computer sound card

A Chatcord is a compact device that connects the duplex audio stream between a sound card of a computer, and the telephone-set. It enables the use of a Plain Old Telephone System (POTS) to talk via the Internet away from the computer, after a connection is established from the desktop using your specific softphone (such as MSN or Skype).

A number of compact devices exist, as well as many do-it-yourself web pages where instructions for assembling one are given.

== See also ==
- Acoustic coupler
