= Snom =

German brand of VoIP telephones

Snom Technology GmbH
- Type: Subsidiary
- Industry: Telecommunications
- Founded: 1997; 29 years ago
- Headquarters: Berlin, Germany
- Area served: Worldwide
- Key people: Fabio Albanini
- Products: VoIP Desktop and DECT phones (SIP protocol), VoIP and analog hospitality phones.
- Number of employees: 70
- Parent: VTech (2016-present)
- Subsidiaries: USA, United Kingdom, Netherlands, France, Italy, Spain, Poland, CIS, South Africa and Australia.
- Website: www.snom.com

Snom Technology GmbH /snʊm/ is a German company which manufactures Voice over Internet Protocol (VoIP) telephones, based on the IETF standard Session Initiation Protocol (SIP). Snom's products are targeted at the small- to medium-sized business sector, home offices, Internet service providers, carriers, and original equipment manufacturers. The company, founded in 1996 and headquartered in Berlin, is a wholly owned subsidiary of VTech Holdings Limited, since 2016.

== History ==
Snom was founded in 1997 in Berlin, Germany, by Christian Stredicke and Nicolas-Peter Pohland, former computer scientists at Technische Universität Berlin. In 1999, the company began producing VoIP telephones with the introduction of the snom 100 model. By 2000, the company focussed on a vision to make interoperable components for enterprise communication systems. Instead of selling one telephony platform solution, the company emphasized stand-alone VoIP phones that are compatible across standards-based platforms from different vendors, which became possible with the introduction of the Session Initiation Protocol (SIP) that had recently been standardized in the Internet Engineering Task Force (IETF).

In 2001, Snom started a joint venture in Bangalore, India. After some attempts to develop parts of the product in India, this office shifted to a focus in sales. In 2006, Snom opened an office in North Andover, Massachusetts to enter the North American market. In 2008, Snom Italy SRL was founded, in 2009 Snom France SARL and in 2010 snom UK Ltd. Distributors network include companies in EMEA, CIS region, North America and Australia.

In late 2016, Snom Technology AG was acquired by VTech Holdings Limited. The transaction was completed on 21 November 2016.

The company is headed by Chi Hoi Tong, Ka Hung Tong and Chi Keung Wong. Members of the Supervisory Board include Allan Chi Yun Wong, King Fai Pang and Hon Kwong Leung.

== Products ==
The snom 100 VoIP desk telephone was one of the first commercial voice-over-IP telephones in the telecommunication sector. The phone was initially based on the H.323 protocol, but was equipped with support for the Session Initiation Protocol the following year, as SIP matured technologically, and gained international recognition in the IETF community. A followup model was the snom 105, which added a second Ethernet interface to permit chaining the telephone to a desk top computer to use only a single network drop cable at the office station.

The snom 105 was followed by a series of 200-type desk telephones that featured a major dimensional redesign with a new handset and two sizes of LCD displays. Produced were the model 200 and 220. Another 100-series set, the snom 190, with the same form factor of the 200, concluded this technology level in the Fall of 2004, and paved the way for the 300-series released in Winter 2004.

All of snom's software exists in the firmware of its phones, and VoIP telephones support all common standards, as well as the latest technologies for traversal of network address translators (NAT), telephone number mapping (ENUM), and virtual private networks (VPN).

All snom phones are compatible with SIP-based telephone systems and system components, including open source platforms such as Asterisk, SER, sipXecs, and IP-PBX systems offered by companies such as BroadSoft, Epygi (Quadro IP PBX), MetaSwitch, Pandora (Worksmart), ADTRAN (NetVanta UC Server), pbxnsip, Sylantro, Sangoma Technologies Corporation, and others.

Snom's phones include security features based on the two VoIP security standards SIPs (RFC 5246) and SRTP (RFC 3711). Some devices also support virtual private networking and wireless encryption (WEP/WPA).

== Industry recognition ==
- TMC Labs 2003 Innovation Awards
- Internet Telephony 2006 Excellence Award
- Internet Telephony's 2006 Top 100 Voices in IP Communication- Dr. Christian Stredicke
- Pulver 100, 2007
