= UNIStim =

Telecommunications protocol

UNIStim (or Unified Networks IP Stimulus) is a deprecated telecommunications protocol developed by Nortel (now acquired by Avaya) for IP phone (terminals and soft phones) and IP PBX communications.

Most other manufacturers of IP PBX equipment (Aastra, Alcatel, Avaya, etc.) have followed the same path, developing their own proprietary protocols. These protocols are being gradually replaced or complemented by standardized protocols, including H.323 and (especially) SIP.

== Operating principle ==
The protocols works through a "master" / "slave" mode of operations. They simply reflect the basic actions a user can perform on his terminal (such as press a button) and the commands that can be sent to the display through the network to the terminal (such as turn a light on or display a message ). The "stimulus" can implement easily any new facility telephone without having to modify the software embedded in the terminals, which simplifies the procedures for maintenance and upgrade of the installed base. In this sense, the stimulus protocols differ from functional protocols (such as SIP or H.323) that impose on the one hand that the service is defined in the standard and that the terminal loads specific logic corresponding to the service in question. This approach allows manufacturers to quickly deliver a wide range of services without having to wait until these services are standardized.

Nortel has been very active in the standardization effort of these protocols within the IETF, drawing on its work with pre-standard UNIStim and already developed work on the Nortel IP PBX systems and its IP Centrex platforms from 1996. Contributions common between Nortel and Cisco Systems, for example, culminated in the publication of the IETF RFC 3054 "Media Gateway IP Phone Application Profile", outlining the options in the Megaco/H.248 protocol for IP command posts.

The UNIStim protocol is implemented on Avaya IP PBX systems and licensed by third-party suppliers. See, for example, the release of the company Spectralink.

Details on the implementation of the protocol UNISTIM are available in the document "Telephony and Data Network Services at a Telephone", filed in the United States Patent No. 7068641 on May 7, 1999. The Secure UNIStim protocol is implemented on the AS5300 or the CS2100 enables encryption of the UNIStim protocol with the use of a SMC 2450.

== Ports ==
- 4100/udp Nortel UNIStim (Unified Networks IP Stimulus), i200x
- 5000/rudp Nortel UNIStim (Unified Networks IP Stimulus), i2002/i2004 on ITG Line
- 5100/rudp Nortel UNIStim (Unified Networks IP Stimulus), ITG Line
- 5105/udp Nortel UNIStim (Unified Networks IP Stimulus) FTP (UFTP)
- 6800/tcp Nortel Unified Manager
- 7000/rudp Nortel UNIStim (Unified Networks IP Stimulus), BCM FP1 VoIP to/from IP Phones

== See also ==
- H.323
- MGCP
- SIP
- List of Nortel patents
