= IP PBX =

Telephone system with IP connectivity

An IP PBX (“Internet Protocol private branch exchange”) is a telephony system that uses Internet Protocol to transmit voice and other communication data. Unlike traditional PBX systems that depend on circuit-switched networks, IP PBX utilizes packet-switched networks, allowing voice, data, and video to be transmitted over the same network infrastructure. This convergence simplifies the communication architecture and provides a unified platform for managing internal and external communications.

== Function ==
IP PBX is primarily a software hosted on a regular desktop or server as per the requirement demands based on the expected traffic & criticality. Till 2019 IP PBX were deployed primarily as inbound and outbound call center solutions for large corporate and commercial cloud telephony operators worldwide cloud communications. Most of the IP PBX installation uses Asterisk (PBX) for its telephony support, built on LAMP (Linux-Apache-MySQL-PHP). With telecom service providers across the world is slowly preferring SIP Trunks over Primary Rate Interface as main enterprise communication delivery, the IP PBXs will now be in demand extensively. As IP PBX is software, functions and features can be designed based on the customers' requirements such as conference calling, XML-RPC control of live calls, interactive voice response (IVR), TTS/ASR (text to speech/automatic speech recognition), PSTN interconnectability supporting both analog and digital circuits, VoIP protocols including SIP, Inter-Asterisk eXchange, H.323, Jingle and others.

== IP PBX software ==
- 3CX Phone System - was based on Windows operating system, but now has Windows and Linux versions.
- Asterisk - based on Linux operating system and has the largest market share.

Most other IP PBXs were derived and customised on Asterisk, such as:

- Bicom Systems
- Dialexia
- trixbox (formerly Asterisk@Home)
- FreeSWITCH

== See also ==
- Cloud communications
