= 3CX =

Cyprus software company

3CX, Inc.
- 3CX

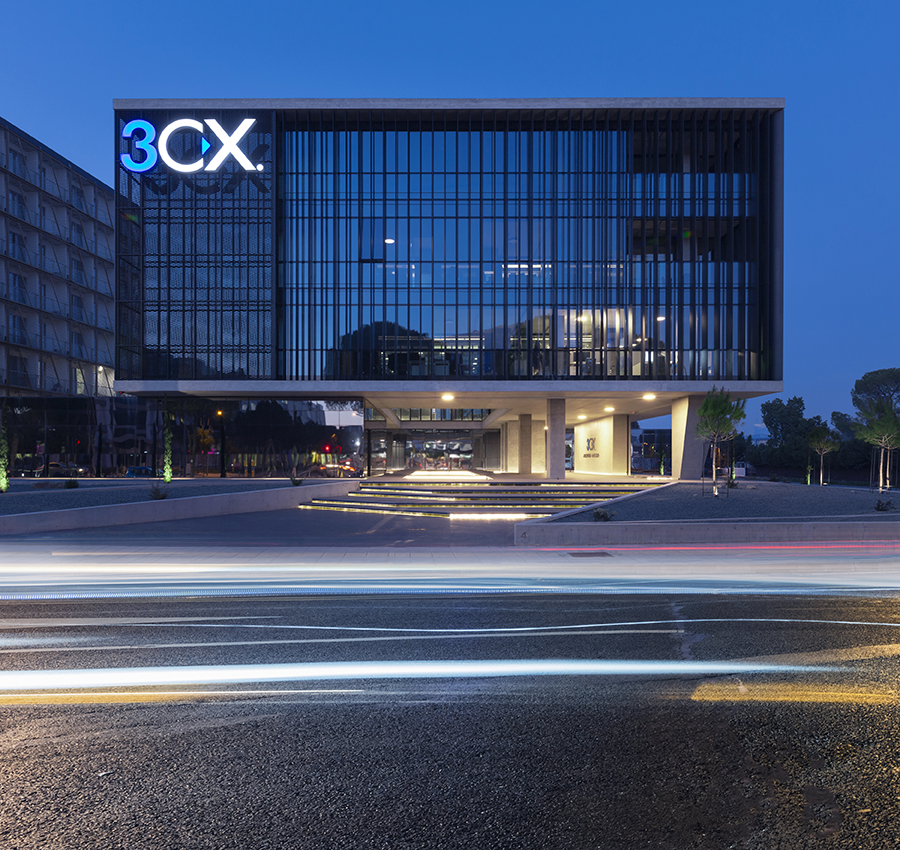
- 3CX Headquarters in Nicosia, Cyprus
- Type: Private
- Industry: Software Development; Telecommunications
- Founded: November 1, 2005; 20 years ago
- Founder: Nick Galea
- Headquarters: Nicosia, Cyprus
- Area served: Worldwide
- Key people: Nick Galea (Founder and CEO)
- Products: 3CX Software PBX
- Number of employees: 200 (2018)
- Website: 3cx.com

3CX, Inc., is a Cyprus-based software development company and developer of the 3CX Phone System.

The 3CX Phone System is a software private branch exchange based on the SIP (Session Initiation Protocol) standard to allow calls via the public switched telephone network (PSTN) or via Voice over Internet Protocol (VoIP) services.

== Company history ==
3CX was founded by Nick Galea in 2005.

In 2006, 3CX released the 3CX Phone System as a free IP PBX for use in a Microsoft Windows environment. The phone system's first commercial edition, v6.0, was released a year later in 2007. Reviews of the product have noted its easy configuration, management, and hardware compatibility.

In the following years, 3CX made a number of acquisitions including eWorks technologies in 2013, the Elastix project and PBX in a Flash in 2016, and Askozia in 2017. In 2019, 3CX acquired WP Live Chat, a free WordPress plugin for live chat integration.

In September 2016, 3CX announced a partnership with BT Wholesale SIP Trunking platform to serve resellers.

In 2017 "PBX Express" was released, allowing a hosted PBX to be created on any hosted virtual private server. The company would later launch a "Hosted by 3CX" offering.

In 2019, Stefan Walther was appointed as the new CEO of the company. In the same year, 3CX was featured on the internet TV show Hak5.

In 2021 with the launch of version 18, 3CX integrated with Microsoft Teams to allow direct routing through the Microsoft platform.

In June 2022, it was announced Walther would step down as CEO, with Galea returning to the position.

== Phone system ==
3CX produces a telephone system under the same name. The system consists of a number of software-based components. It can be accessed via a Web Client, PWA, Desktop App, Management & Admin consoles, softphone for Windows, and smartphone clients for iOS and Android.

3CX can be used with either SIP phones or the clients, or a combination of the two. It provides unified communications functionality including call recordings, multi-level IVR, call center features, voicemail to email, fax to email, integrated video & call conferencing and omnichannel live chat messaging integration.

3CX
- Stable release: Version 20 Update 6 / June 2025
- Written in: C++ and .NET
- Operating system: Microsoft Windows, Linux, macOS, IOS, Android
- Type: Voice over Internet Protocol
- License: Proprietary
- Website: www.3cx.com

== Security incident ==
On 29 March 2023, 3CX acknowledged its desktop client, 3CXDesktopApp, had been compromised to distribute malware. Global cybersecurity firm Mandiant were appointed to conduct a full investigation.

On 20 April 2023, 3CX published the investigation's conclusions, revealing the hacking operation was a byproduct of an earlier software hack from an application from financial software company Trading Technologies, accessed through a 3CX employee's PC. The hack was linked to the same North Korean operators that compromised the Trading Technologies app. As a result, 3CX announced a Security Action Plan to minimize risk of future attacks.

== Major releases ==
Each major release listed below was followed by multiple maintenance updates.

| Version | Build Number | Release date |
|---|---|---|
| v20 | 20.0.0.1620 | February 2024 |
| v18 | 18.0.0.1880 | August 2021 |
| v16 | 16.0.0.1581 | 27 March 2019 |
| v15.5 | 15.5.1694.0 | 1 July 2017 |
| v15 | 56008 | 1 July 2016 |
| v14 | 44241 | 1 September 2015 |
| v12.5 | 12.5.37957.880 | 21 October 2014 |
| v12 SP1 | 32495.362 | 1 September 2013 |
| v11 | | 1 July 2012 |
| v10 | 10.19117 | 1 March 2011 |
| v09 SP1 | 9.13763 | 1 July 2010 |
| v08 | 8.0.9414 | 2 October 2009 |
| v07 | 7.0.4249 | 4 December 2008 |
| v06 | 6.0.612 | 23 June 2008 |

Table created according to the "3CX Phone System Build History".

== Awards ==
- 2015: 'Price/Performance Value Leadership Award', awarded by Frost & Sullivan
- 2015: 'Tech Innovator Award', awarded by CRN
- 2015: 'Most Innovative Product', awarded by the Innovationspreis - IT
- 2012: 'Best Emerging Technology Vendor' awarded by CRN
- 2011: 'Best Emerging Technology Vendor' awarded by CRN

== See also ==
- Voice modem
- Comparison of VoIP software
- List of SIP software
- IP PBX
