= Mark Spencer (computer engineer) =

American computer engineer

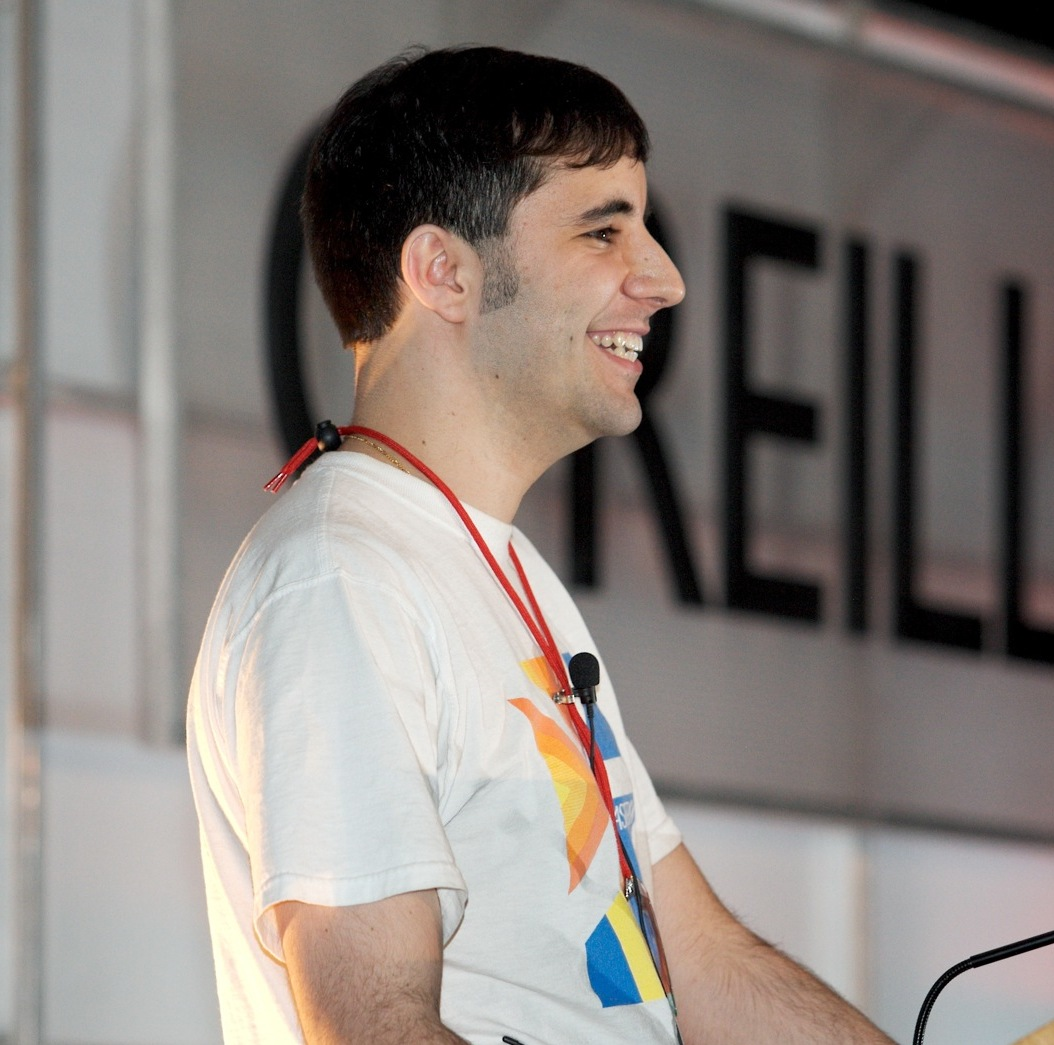
- Spencer at the 2006 O'Reilly Emerging Telephony Conference
- Born: April 8, 1977 (age 49); Alabama, U.S.
- Education: Auburn University
- Occupations: Engineeer; entrepreneur
- Known for: Pidgin, Asterisk, & XFS

Mark Spencer (born April 8, 1977) is an American computer engineer and is the original author of the GTK+-based instant messaging client Gaim (which has since been renamed to Pidgin), the L2TP daemon l2tpd and the Cheops Network User Interface.

Spencer is also the creator of Asterisk, a Linux-based open-sourced PBX. He was the founder, chairman and CTO of Digium, an open-source telecommunications supplier most notable for its development and sponsorship of Asterisk. Spencer shifted from CEO to chairman and CTO in early 2007.

== Early life ==
Spencer was born and raised in Auburn, Alabama. He attended Auburn University where both his parents were professors. In high school, he was mentored by another Auburn professor, Thaddeus Roppel, and Mark Smith, co-founder of Adtran.

== Career ==
As a computer engineering major at Auburn University, Mark was the original author of the GTK+-based instant messaging client Gaim (which has since been renamed to Pidgin), the L2TP daemon l2tpd and the Cheops Network User Interface. He also co-oped at Huntsville-based networking and telecommunications corporation Adtran, and started a Linux technical support business. Unable to afford a PBX for his new company, he created the Asterisk™ Linux-based open-source PBX and founded Digium Inc, an open-source telecommunications supplier. Mark served as CEO, Chairman, and CTO as Digium and Asterisk spearheaded the global telecom revolution that allowed businesses and developers to build affordable, scalable communication systems without the need for expensive proprietary hardware or software, including Voice over Internet Protocol (VoIP) solutions. Today Asterisk continues to be the world’s leading open-source framework for integrating real-time, multi-protocol communications applications.

When Digium was sold in 2018, Mark focused his software skills on the aviation industry. As an FAA-certified air transport pilot, Mark knew that aerospace avionics suffered some of the same oligopolistic problems that had plagued telecom: reduced competition, high costs, and high barriers to entry. Mark founded Avilution, LLC to create Android apps including QuickWeather and AviationMaps. AviationMaps was later spun off to FlightPro, then DroidEFB. Adapting a similar strategy as Asterisk, he developed the eXtensible Flight System (XFS), a modular open-system avionics software architecture. XFS has integrated whole avionics suites in civil light aircraft such as the Zenith CH750, customized flight test instrumentation in developmental eVTOLs such as the Beta Technologies Ava XC technology demonstrator, and contributed to an FAA-approved supplemental type certificate for integrating a replacement air data computer into the popular Eclipse 500 light business jet. Since 2020 the U.S. Dept of Defense has become Avilution’s largest customer, as XFS has proven an ideal framework for implementing modular open-system approaches (MOSA) to achieve higher interoperability, faster upgrades, and lower costs for military avionics and mission systems. In 2023, Avilution received the DoD MOSA Summit Innovation Challenge Award for “innovation with the potential to solve our nation’s most critical MOSA challenges.” In 2024, Spencer and others authored a paper, “Avilution’s eXtensible Flight System (XFS)–Making Modular Open-System Approaches Practical”, selected for both Best of Session for Modular Open Systems Approach (MOSA) and Best of Track for Integrated Modular Avionics (IMA). In addition to that, Avilution was also honored to be further selected for Third Place in the overall Best of Conference awards for the best of the 235 academic papers submitted to the 2024 Digital Avionics Systems Conference in San Diego, CA.
