= Grandstream Networks =

Telecommunications company

- Type: Private
- Industry: Telecommunication
- Founded: 2002
- Headquarters: Boston, Massachusetts
- Key people: CEO: David Li
- Products: IP Voice & Video Communications, IP Surveillance
- Number of employees: 500 worldwide
- Website: www.grandstream.com

Grandstream Networks is a manufacturer of IP voice and video communications equipment, video surveillance, gateways and analog telephone adapters (ATAs), and Asterisk-based IP-PBX appliances. Grandstream supplies small and medium businesses and consumers with open-standard SIP-based products.

Grandstream Networks is headquartered in Boston, Massachusetts, and has regional offices in Plano, Texas and Los Angeles, California in the US; Casablanca, Morocco; Valencia, Spain; Venezuela; Puchong, Malaysia; Singapore; and in Shenzhen, China.

The company was founded by David Li in 2002 and is headquartered in Boston, Massachusetts.
