= HylaFAX =

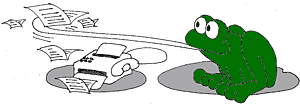
- Original author(s): Sam Leffler
- Initial release: June 1991
- Stable release: 6.0.7 / September 18, 2018; 6 years ago
- Repository: git.hylafax.org/HylaFAX
- Operating system: Unix-like
- Type: Fax server
- License: BSD-style; Commercial license
- Website: www.hylafax.org

HylaFAX+
- Stable release: 7.0.10 / January 23, 2025; 53 days ago
- Repository: sf.net/p/hylafax/HylaFAX+/
- License: BSD-style
- Website: hylafax.sourceforge.io

HylaFAX is a fax server for Unix-like computer systems. It uses a client-server design and supports the sending and receiving of faxes as well as text pages, on any scale from low to very high volumes, if necessary making use of large numbers of modems. It is open-source, free software and can be used commercially without charge.

== History ==
Sam Leffler, while working at Silicon Graphics (SGI), wrote a fax server for SGI's IRIX servers called FlexFAX and released it to the public in June 1991. Leffler and others worked for several years on FlexFAX, adding new features and porting the software to new platforms. In April 1995 FlexFAX was renamed HylaFAX with the 3.0pl0 release to avoid potential trademark issues.

Following the 4.0pl0 release in September 1996, Leffler began to leave working on the project, which caused development to slow dramatically. He did release version 4.0pl1 in December; however, in February 1997 Sam officially handed maintainership of HylaFAX over to Matthias Apitz, who had previously been known for his maintainership of the SVR4 HylaFAX binary releases and the so-named "HylaFAQ".

Some HylaFAX community members were frustrated that code releases and development work did not increase noticeably after the maintainership transition. Apitz did release HylaFAX 4.0pl2 a year later, in February 1998, and anticipated an eventual 4.0pl3. However, some community members were still unhappy with the slow development pace.

In November 1998, Darren Nickerson, maintainer of the tpc.int network, and Robert Colquhoun led an attempt to revitalize HylaFAX development by the creation of hylafax.org, a central repository for HylaFAX development, downloads, documentation, mailing lists, etc. Colquhoun released a number of "rjc" versions before releasing 4.1beta1 in July 1999 and then 4.1beta2 in August.

In early 2000, newcomer Lee Howard began assisting Nickerson to prepare the next release after development had once again slowed down. A lot of work went into the 4.1beta3 release in February 2001, and in July a non-beta 4.1 was finally released. Since that time releases (now numbered like 4.1.1, 4.1.2, and so forth) have been comparatively regular and the development pace has been relatively steady with releases occurring roughly every six months.

In March 2002, Nickerson started iFAX, Inc., endeavoring to sell and commercialize HylaFAX in particular to enterprise customers. Thus iFAX began selling a proprietary product called HylaFAX Enterprise Edition which supported the proprietary interfacing of Brooktrout fax hardware.

The development pace was still not fast enough for some, in particular Howard. And so after the 4.1.6 release in May 2003 the code repository was branched into a "4.1" legacy branch, to satisfy the conservative elements, and a "4.2" development branch to satisfy Howard. The development branch then began the largest period of code work since before Leffler released 4.0pl0. The Class 1 driver was endowed with ECM capability, fax batching support (sending multiple faxes in one call) was added, extended resolution support began, MMR and JBIG data compressions were supported, and color fax reception was supported all in a relatively short amount of time. This set of developments, and the subsequent stabilization of those features, made HylaFAX not only the best, most feature-rich open-source fax software available, but it also became easily the most feature-rich fax software of any kind that supported average, inexpensive off-the-shelf fax modems.

After many years of disagreements between Howard and Nickerson regarding the direction and pace of the software development, Howard began developing HylaFAX at SourceForge.net in October 2005. That work later became known as HylaFAX+. Version numbers initially added another "dot" (like "4.3.0.11") and then simply changed outright to "5.0.0", "5.0.1", and so forth.

HylaFAX development continues at SourceForge, with a release in January, 2025. The last release at hylafax.org was in September, 2018.
