= Digium =

Technology company based in Huntsville, Alabama

- Company type: Subsidiary
- Industry: Telecommunications
- Founded: 1999
- Founder: Mark Spencer
- Headquarters: 445 Jan Davis Dr NW, Huntsville, Alabama, United States
- Area served: 170 countries
- Key people: Mark Spencer; Founder
- Products: Switchvox Business Phone Systems (Cloud-Based and On-Premises); Switchvox Mobile; Cloud Services; Asterisk Open Source Software; Asterisk Commercial Licensing; Asterisk Support; WebRTC; IP Phones; VoIP Gateways; Telephony Interface Cards; Asterisk Add-On Products
- Parent: Sangoma Technologies Corporation

Digium, Inc. is a communications technology company based in Huntsville, Alabama, and since 2018, a subsidiary of Sangoma Technologies Corporation. The company makes VoIP business phone systems, IP phones, and hardware products. It was founded in 1999 by Mark Spencer.

Digium offers both business-to-consumer and business-to-business communications products.

== History ==
In 1999, while a computer engineering student at Auburn University, Mark Spencer founded Linux Support Services (LSS). His motivation for starting the company was the high cost of existing business phone systems. Spencer named it Asterisk after the programming wildcard symbol and the ”star” phone key. It enabled phone calls over the Internet, providing an alternative to hardware-dependent PBX systems at a reduced cost.

Asterisk-based business phone systems were the first of a new generation of VoIP-based communications products to compete with companies such as Cisco and Avaya. Reflecting the company's shift away from Linux support to developing Asterisk and new communications solutions, Linux Support Services was renamed Digium in 2001.

Digium provides a business phone system powered by Asterisk, either as an on-premises solution or a cloud-based PBX solution. The service can be extended to employee mobile devices.

It is estimated that Asterisk is currently being used by developers in 170 countries and is running on approximately 1 million servers.

== Acquisition ==
Sangoma Technologies Corporation announced on August 23, 2018, that they entered into a definitive agreement, closing on August 31, 2018, expecting to pay US$28 million on a debt-free and cash-free basis, subject to customary working capital adjustments, to acquire Digium. The purchase price consists of $24.3 million in cash and 3,943,025 Sangoma common shares (representing $3.7 million based on a ten-day volume-weighted average price of $1.2214 per common share). Digium generated approximately $30 million in revenue in its fiscal year ended December 31, 2017, with consolidated assets (net of cash) of approximately $11 million, no debt, and a net loss of approximately $4 million. The transaction closed and was finalized on September 5, 2018.
