= Yealink =

Chinese phone manufacturer

Yealink Network Technology Co., Ltd.
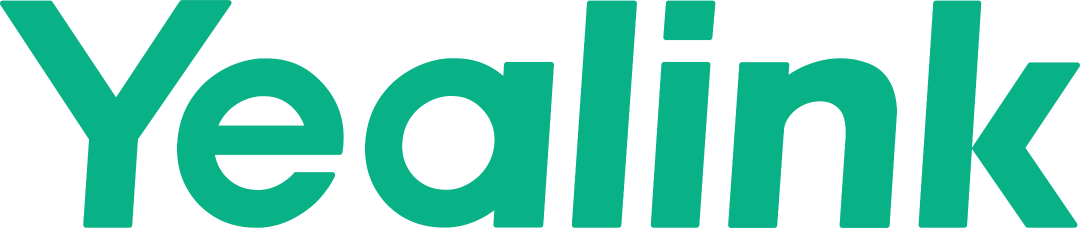
- Logo used since 2006
- Native name: 亿联网络技术股份有限公司
- Type: Co. Ltd.
- ISIN: CNE100002PC5
- Industry: Telecommunication
- Founded: 2001
- Headquarters: Xiamen, China
- Key people: Chen Zhisong, COB; Liannchang Zhan, CEO
- Revenue: 4.35 billion CNY (2023)
- Number of employees: > 1,680
- Website: www.yealink.com

Yealink Network Technology is a company in the telecommunications sector based in Xiamen, People's Republic of China.

== History ==
Founded in 2001, Yealink quickly became the largest provider of SIP phones in the People's Republic of China. Between 2009 and 2011, the company achieved the largest growth in the endpoint market. In 2013, a research and development centre was opened in Hangzhou. The portfolio was expanded with the first video conferencing system in 2015 and the company was able to quickly establish itself on the market. This was followed by the IPO on the Shenzhen Stock Exchange in 2017. Yealink became the leader in SIP desk phones in 2018.

== Products ==
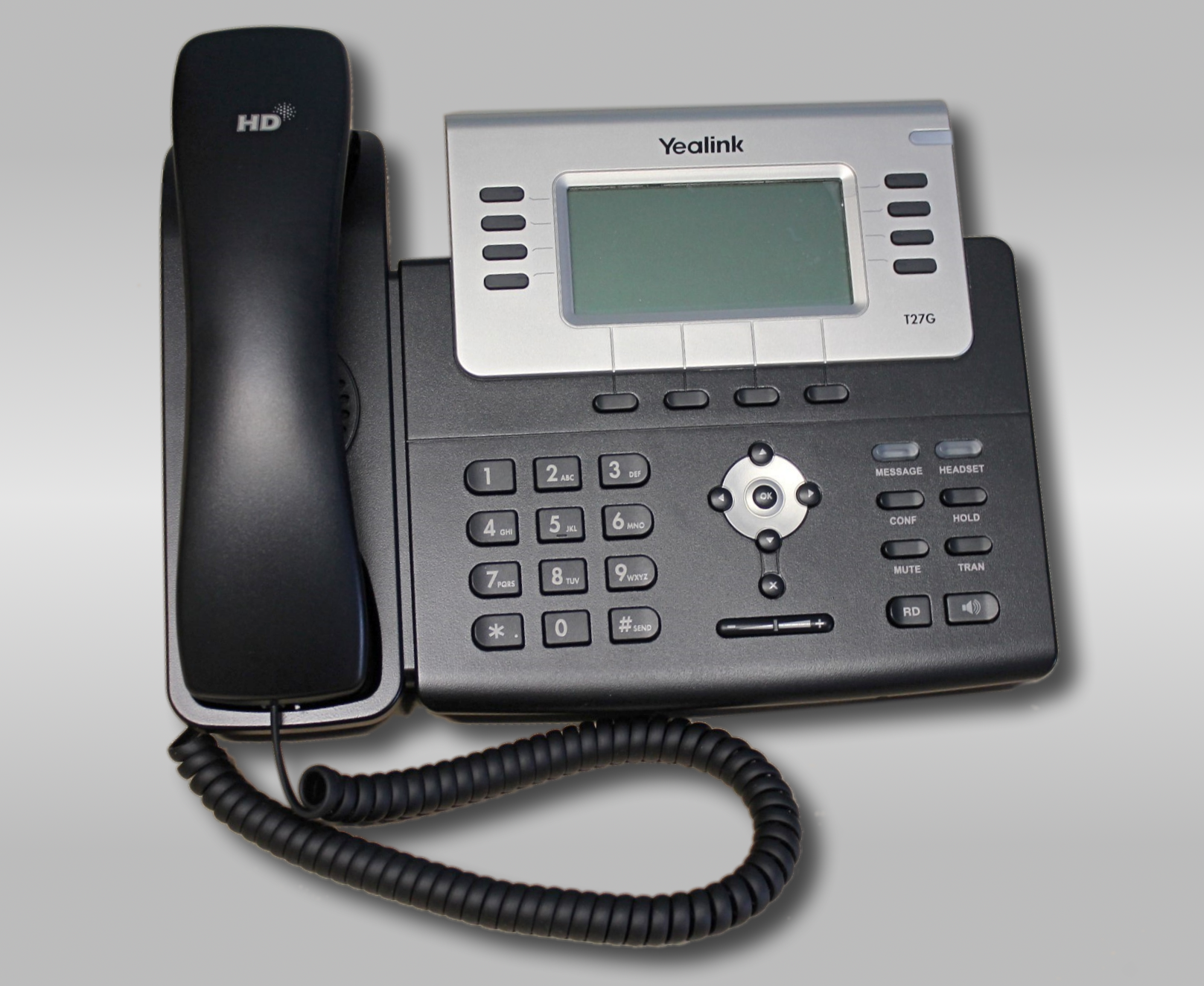
Yealink T27G desk phone (2016)

- SIP phones
- DECT phones
- Audio and video conferencing hardware
- Headsets
- End devices for Microsoft Teams, Skype, and Zoom Video Communications
