= Sangoma Technologies Corporation =

Canadian communications company

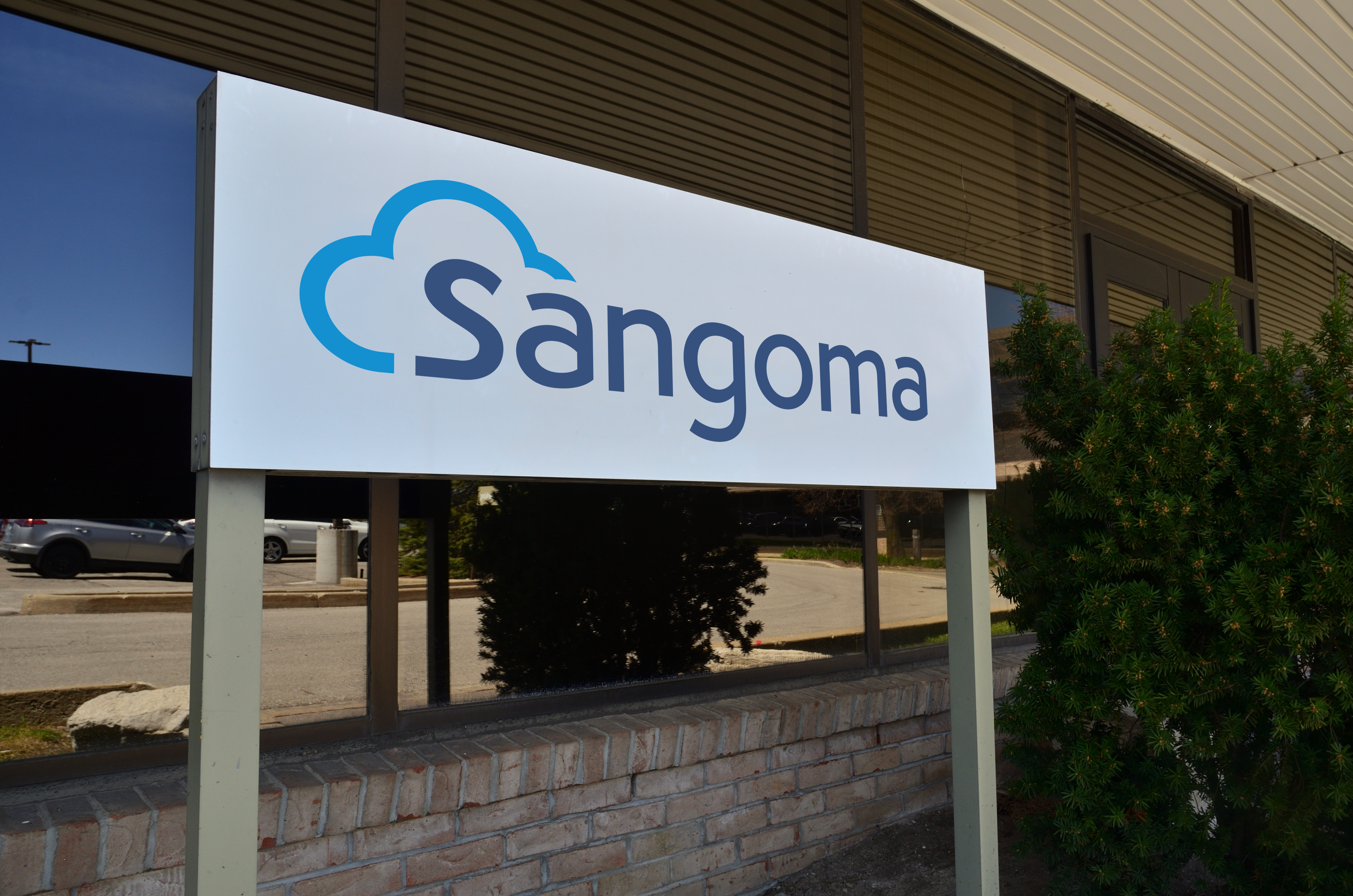
- Sangoma Technologies headquarters in Markham
- Type: Public
- Traded as: TSX: STC
- Industry: Telecommunications
- Founded: 1984
- Founder: David Mandelstam
- Headquarters: Markham, Ontario, Canada
- Area served: Worldwide
- Key people: Charles Salemeh, CEO; Larry Stock, CFO
- Products: PBXact; Switchvox; FreePBX; SIPStation; Session Border Controllers; Telephony Cards; VoIP Gateways
- Revenue: ▲$252 million CAD (FY2023)
- Net income: ▼ -$29 million CAD (FY2023)
- Subsidiaries: VoIP Supply, Digium, Inc., .e4, Star2Star
- Website: sangoma.com

Sangoma Corporation, formerly known as Sangoma Technologies Corporation, is a Canadian company specializing in Communications as a Service (CaaS) solutions, Voice over IP (VoIP) hardware, and software for businesses. Founded in 1984 and headquartered in Markham, Ontario, Sangoma is publicly traded on the Toronto Stock Exchange (TSX: STC) and NASDAQ (SANG). The company rebranded to Sangoma Corporation in [year of name change, e.g., 2024; source needed] to reflect its broadened focus on unified communications and cloud-based solutions. Sangoma has grown through strategic acquisitions, including FreePBX in 2015, Digium in 2018, Star2Star in 2021, and Netfortris in 2022, establishing itself as a key player in the unified communications and VoIP markets.

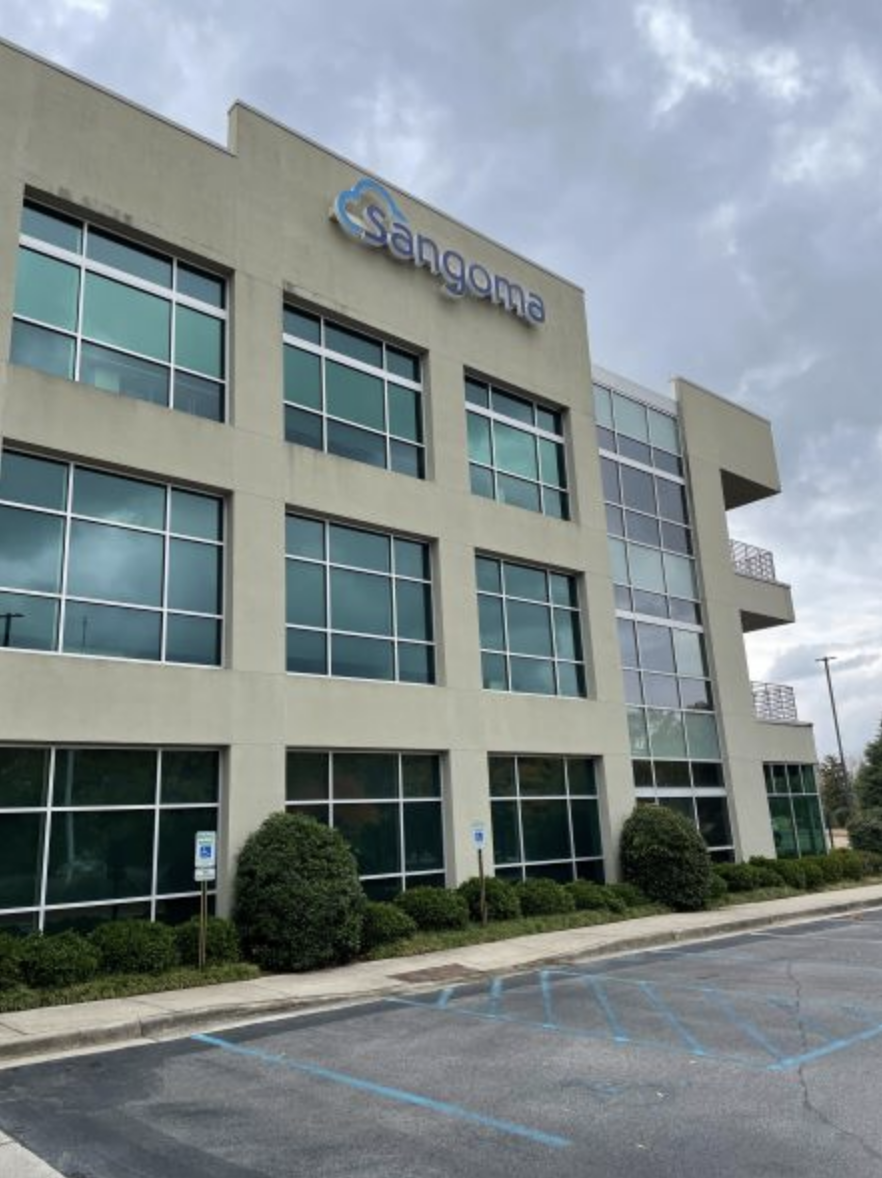
Sangoma Technologies

== History ==
Sangoma Corporation was founded in 1984 in Markham, Ontario, initially focusing on telecommunications hardware, such as telephony cards for voice and data connectivity. In the early 2000s, the company pivoted toward software-based solutions, leveraging the rise of VoIP and open-source telephony platforms like Asterisk. Sangoma listed on the Toronto Stock Exchange (TSX: STC) in 2008, a milestone that facilitated further expansion. Its 2021 listing on NASDAQ (SANG) marked its entry into the U.S. market, supporting its global growth strategy. The company’s acquisitions of FreePBX, Digium, Star2Star, and Netfortris have solidified its leadership in the open-source telephony and CaaS markets. In [year, e.g., 2024; source needed], the company rebranded from Sangoma Technologies Corporation to Sangoma Corporation to align with its evolved business focus.

== Products and services ==
Sangoma provides a comprehensive suite of Communications as a Service (CaaS) solutions, VoIP hardware, and software, targeting small to medium-sized businesses (SMBs), enterprises, and service providers. Its offerings include:

=== Cloud Communications (CaaS) ===
Sangoma’s cloud-based unified communications as a service (UCaaS) solutions integrate voice, video, and messaging to enhance business connectivity. Key products include:

- Sangoma Meet: A multi-party video conferencing platform designed for remote collaboration, offering features like screen sharing and recording.
- Sangoma Phone: A desktop and mobile softphone application that supports voice calls, SMS/MMS, and call forwarding, integrated with Sangoma’s UCaaS platform.
- Sangoma CX: A cloud-native contact center suite for managing inbound interactions across multiple channels, including voice, email, and chat.
- Sangoma TeamHub: A unified communications and collaboration platform that enhances business productivity through integrated messaging and file sharing.

=== VoIP Hardware ===
Sangoma manufactures telephony cards, gateways, session border controllers (SBCs), and Wi-Fi access points to support VoIP infrastructure. These products enable integration with on-premises and cloud-based systems.

=== Open-Source Software ===
Sangoma is the primary developer and sponsor of:

- Asterisk: An open-source framework for building real-time communication applications.
- FreePBX: A web-based GUI for managing Asterisk, widely used in third-party distributions like AsteriskNOW and Incredible PBX.
- PBXact: A commercial UC system built on FreePBX, tailored for enterprise-grade deployments.

=== Managed Services ===
Sangoma offers managed connectivity, network, and security services, including SD-WAN, VPN, and firewall solutions with features like antivirus protection and intrusion prevention.

== Acquisitions ==
Sangoma has expanded its portfolio through strategic acquisitions, strengthening its position in the UCaaS and VoIP markets.

- FreePBX (2015): On January 2, 2015, Sangoma acquired Schmooze, the publisher of FreePBX, a widely used open-source GUI for managing Asterisk-based PBX systems. This acquisition enhanced Sangoma’s software offerings, making it a leader in open-source telephony solutions. [Additional source: e.g., TechCrunch article on FreePBX acquisition; source needed.]
- Digium, Inc. (2018): On September 5, 2018, Sangoma acquired Digium, the creator of Asterisk, based in Huntsville, Alabama. This move solidified Sangoma’s control over the Asterisk ecosystem and expanded its U.S. presence.
- Star2Star Communications (2021): On March 29, 2021, Sangoma acquired Star2Star Communications through its subsidiary, Sangoma US Inc. This acquisition strengthened Sangoma’s UCaaS portfolio, adding Star2Star’s cloud-native communication solutions and expanding its customer base to over 2.7 million UC seats. The deal positioned Sangoma as a stronger competitor in the cloud communications market.
- NetFortris (2022): On 2022, Sangoma acquired NetFortris, a U.S.-based provider of cloud communications, secure network services, and SD-WAN solutions. This acquisition expanded Sangoma’s UCaaS and managed services portfolio, strengthening its presence in the North American market and enhancing its capabilities in delivering end-to-end business communications solutions.

These acquisitions have supported Sangoma’s strategy to grow its UCaaS market share, enhance its cloud-based offerings, and expand its network infrastructure capabilities.

== Operations ==
Sangoma is headquartered in Markham, Ontario, Canada, with additional offices in the United States (Huntsville, Alabama) and other regions following its acquisitions. As of 2025, Sangoma generates trailing twelve-month revenue of $238 million and has a market capitalization of $185 million. The company employs approximately [employee count, e.g., 500; source needed] staff globally. Sangoma serves over 100,000 customers across more than 2.7 million UC seats, primarily targeting SMBs, enterprises, and service providers in North America, Europe, and Asia. Its products are distributed through a global network of resellers, system integrators, and cloud service providers.
