= Tekelec =

Tekelec, Inc.
- Type: Public
- Industry: telecommunication-equipment manufacturing
- Founded: Calabasas, California (1971)
- Defunct: 2013
- Successor: Oracle Corporation
- Headquarters: Morrisville, North Carolina
- Key people: Philip Black, President and CEO; Michael Leigh, COO and Vice President Sales & Marketing; Joseph Noble, Vice President-Sales; Hubert de Pesquidoux, Chairman; Ronald J. de Lange, President and CEO; Gregory Rush, Senior Vice President, CFO
- Products: Chameleon 32 Protocol Simulator/Analyzer, Session Management, Diameter Signaling Router, Policy Management, Subscriber Data Management, Performance Intelligence Center, Mobile Messaging
- Number of employees: 1140 (2012)
- Website: tekelec.com at the Wayback Machine (archived 2011-02-03)

Tekelec, Inc. was a Morrisville, North Carolina–based telecommunications company. It developed hardware and software for networks that are fixed, wireless, or packet-based. It provided IP services to help mobile carriers with network signaling, policy control, and subscriber data management.

The company, founded in Calabasas, California, in 1971, was acquired by Oracle in 2013, from Siris Capital Group.

== Corporate history ==
=== Founding by Jean-Claude Asscher ===
In 1961, Jean-Claude Asscher founded Tekelec-Airtronic, SA, a French electronics company with emphasis on the aviation industry.

In 1977, Tekelec, Inc. was founded as a sales office for Tekelec-Airtronic. Tekelec was then founded in 1979 by Philip Black and Jean-Claude Asscher, half owned by Tekelec-Airtronic but still independent. It was founded as a North American company specializing in telecommunications products, such as telecommunications test and network simulation equipment. It was based in Santa Monica, California Tekelec was initially financed by proceeds earned by Jean-Claude Asscher through Tekelec-Airtronic. The Company moved to Calabasas, California, in 1984.

For many years, Jean-Claude Asscher was president, CEO, and chairman of the board of directors of both Tekelec-Airtronic and Tekelec. In recent years Jean-Claude Asscher has served as only chairman of Tekelec's board of directors while continuing to be the president of Tekelec-Airtronic's board of directors as well as its chairman. Tekelec, Inc.’s IPO was in May 1986 on NASDAQ under the symbol TKLC. CEO Phillip Black, COO Michael Leigh, CFO Phillip Alford.

=== Philip Black spinoff and going public ===
Asscher found Philip Black, in the early 1980s, who was tasked with re-creating the U.S Tekelec company so that could successfully sell Tekelec Airtronic products in the U.S., or create their own testing products. Philip Black assembled a core crew of people, and his team created, marketed and sold the protocol simulator analyzers, named Chameleon and Chameleon II which fueled the sales of Tekelec for over 10 years. Tekelec successfully competed with two pre-existing competitors, Atlantic Research and Idacom, to become the dominant player in this specific type of test equipment. The company went public in the mid-1980s. Tekelec later transitioned to operating equipment in the form of Signalling System 7 products, under the initial lead of Peter Vicars, who followed Philip Black as CEO.

In 1985, Tekelec established a subsidiary in Tokyo, Japan. In 1986 the company went public.

=== Peter N Vicars as CEO ===
Logo used from the 1990s to 2010

Peter N Vicars joined Tekelec and served as its President and Chief Executive Officer from July 1987 until January 1994. During this tenure revenues increased from $13M to $58M while maintaining six years of double-digit profitability within its core business of testing solutions which represented 85% of corporate revenues. Vicars acquired and integrated a leading SS7 company (Protocol Technologies) to strengthen Tekelec's market position in cellular and switching technology. Based on that acquisition, Vicars guided the entry into a new market for the corporation. The Eagle platform and revenues grew to $12 million over the first year of product shipments. Vicars is also credited for implementing an expense reduction program, due to the switching product startup development and initial market entry costs, which returned the corporation to profitability.

In March 1992, the company created the subsidiary Tekelec Canada.

In March 1998, Michael L. Margolis became CEO.

In 2001, T-Mobile Germany signed a deal with Tekelec.

In February 2003, Frederick M. Lax became CEO.

In May 2003, Tekelec said it would buy a controlling share of Santera, therefore creating a subsidiary to sell products such as softswitches, media gateways, and signaling gateways.

Tekelec opened a subsidiary in India in 2004.

In 2004, Tekelec acquired the softswitch company Taqua Systems in Richardson, Texas for $85 million in cash. At the time, Tekelec remained based in Calabasas, California under CEO Fred Lax. Lax said that Taqua's focus on small Class 5 switches would complement Tekelec's business in Santera Class 4 packet switch businesses.

In August 2005, Tekelec agreed to buy Steleus Group for $65 million. The deal added switches to Tekelec's product offerings.

=== Ronald J. de Lange ===
Ronald J. de Lange joined Tekelec in July 2005 and served as executive vice president Global Business Solutions before being promoted to CEO in May 2011.

On August 3, 2005, Tekelec purchased German and Czech-based iptelorg GmbH, developer of leading-edge Session Initiation Protocol (SIP) routing software, securing a critical IP Multimedia Subsystem (IMS) capability for Tekelec.

=== Franco (Frank) Plastina ===
Franco Plastina joined Tekelec as president and CEO and as a director in February 2006, taking over from former CEO Fred Lax. Lax had resigned in January 2006, when Tekelec relocated its headquarters from California to Cary. Plastina stepped down from his position as President and CEO of Tekelec in January 2011 following poor results where sales of the main product line, Eagle, dropped off much more sharply than expected, before replacement products (such as policy) became fully available. Krish Prabhu, a member of the Board of Directors, was appointed Interim President and CEO. In April 2006, Tekelec sold its subsidiary IEX Corporation for $200 million. In May 2006, the company said it had restated its financial results for 2003, 2004, and 2005 after accounting errors were found.

=== Acquisitions ===
In 2008, Tekelec's number portability solution was deployed in carriers serving 750 million subscribers, out of more than two billion global subscribers who had number porting capability and as of March 2009, Tekelec had 79 number portability customers in 28 countries, and most recently announced delivery of number portability solutions to T-Mobile Germany.

On February 5, 2008, Tekelec acquired substantially all of the assets of Estacado Systems, LLC, a software development company led by a team that has been instrumental in the creation of Session Initiation Protocol (SIP) and a number of its advanced features.

December 17, 2008: Tekelec acquired mBalance, a Netherlands-based developer of mobile messaging solutions, for US$38 million. In May 2011, about 65% of staff were laid off and over the following year most of the remainder departed, being replaced by contractors; the company has since been resold.

In early May 2010, Tekelec acquired the company Camiant and the subscriber data management (SDM) company Blueslice Networks. Frank Plastine was Tekelec's CEO at the time.

=== Shareholder class action lawsuit ===
On January 6, 2011 a securities fraud class action lawsuit was filed on behalf of Tekelec investors. The lawsuit alleges that Tekelec misled the investing public about its business dealings in emerging markets (namely India), thereby inflating the price of TKLC stock. The lawsuit claims that these misleading statements made by Tekelec amount to a violation of US securities laws, and caused significant financial losses to holders of Tekelec stock.

The share price in Q4 2010 ran at about 18 dollars. By the start of Q2 2011, the share price ran at about 7.75 dollars. In November 2011, investors led by Siris Capital Group agreed to buy Tekelec for $780 million, making the company private. At the time, Tekelec was based in Morrisville, North Carolina, with CEO Ron de Lange. On January 27, 2012, Tekelec announced the completion of its acquisition by a consortium led by Siris Capital Group, LLC ("Siris") and including affiliates of The ComVest Group, funds and accounts managed by GSO Capital Partners LP, Sankaty Advisors LLC, ZelnickMedia and other Siris limited partners and affiliates, in a transaction valued at approximately $780 million.

=== Acquisition by Oracle ===
On March 25, 2013, Oracle announced that it had entered into an agreement to acquire Tekelec. Tekelec joined the Oracle Communications unit.

== Recognition ==
In March 2011, Tekelec's Diameter Signaling Router was recognized by the Frost & Sullivan "New Product Innovation Award, Diameter Routing" for its superior ability to help operators overcome Diameter signaling challenges in LTE networks. Frost & Sullivan independently identified Diameter Routing as a new award category due to at least 60 LTE networks anticipated to be in commercial service by the end of 2012, creating "rapid uptake in Diameter signaling."

In October 2010, it was announced that MetroPCS selected Tekelec's Diameter Signaling Router for deployment in the first U.S. LTE network.

In June 2012, Tekelec was awarded Most Innovative Company by Pipeline Publishing's Innovation Awards. A panel of service providers and industry analysts selected Tekelec as the company that best embraces and promotes innovation throughout its organization.

Industry research and consultancy firm Analysys Mason named Tekelec as the global market leader with 35 percent market share of real-time connection number portability solutions.
