= Network-based Call Signaling =

Protocol used with VoIP

Network-based Call Signaling (NCS) is a profile of the Media Gateway Control Protocol (MGCP) for use in PacketCable applications for voice-over-IP.

A network implementing NCS is designed according to the media gateway control protocol architecture for interconnecting a packet network with the traditional public switched telephone network (PSTN). This architecture physically decomposes the functionality of providing complete end-to-end multimedia telecommunication sessions into several discrete components, notably a media gateway (MG) located at the customer premises that performs the physical translation between analog voice or video streams to packetized digital data, and a media gateway controller (MGC) which is a centralized server that controls typically many media gateways and manages the complexity of call setup, resource negotiation, call routing, and tear-down. In addition, the architecture also uses signaling gateways to the traditional telecommunication channels, such as SS7-based networks.

Like MGCP, NCP is a device control protocol defining the interaction between the MGC, also called a call agent, and its media gateways. It is one layer of the PacketCable suite of specifications and relies upon companion protocol specifications to provide complete end-to-end telecommunication functionality.

Network-based Call Signaling is a modification of the Media Gateway Control Protocol (MGCP).

NCS provides a PacketCable profile of an application programming interface (MGCI), and a corresponding protocol (MGCP) for controlling voice-over-IP (VoIP) embedded clients from external call control elements. An embedded client is a network element that provides:

- Two or more traditional analog (RJ11) access lines to a packet-based telecommunication network.
- Optionally, one or more video lines to a VoIP network

MGCI functions provide for connection control, endpoint control, auditing, and status reporting. They each use the same system model and the same naming conventions.

The modification of MGCP in the NCS profile include the following: NCS only aims at supporting PacketCable-embedded clients. Functionality present in the MGCP 1.0 protocol, which was superfluous to NCS, has been removed. It contains extensions and modifications to MGCP. However, the MGCP architecture, and all of the MGCP constructs relevant to embedded clients, are preserved in NCS. The NCS protocol contains minor simplifications of MGCP 1.0.
