= SGCP =

SGCP may refer to:

- Self-Help Group for Cerebral Palsy, on organization based in Nepal
- Simple Gateway Control Protocol, a communication protocol used within a voice over Internet Protocol
