= MGCP =

MGCP may refer to:

- Glutamate carboxypeptidase II, or mGCP, an enzyme
- Media Gateway Control Protocol, a telecommunication protocol
