= Mobile dialer =

Mobile Dialer is a software application installed and used on mobile phones. Various software providers offer branded mobile dialers. They are used to make VoIP (Voice over Internet Protocol) calls from a mobile hand set. The "Mobile Dialer" or "Mobile VoIP Dialer" uses SIP signaling and can be mapped to a Softswitch or an IP device to work a device for voice communication. Newer mobile dialers also allow users to originate a Voice Call or SMS using their mobile handset. In many countries, VoIP is considered as "illegal Business" and is banned by the government. Mobile Dialer application can run behind network address translation (NAT) and on private IP and can pass through firewalls or blocked networks when combined with tunneling software.

Making calls from the mobile phone is most preferred way of calling. Consumers may switch to VoIP as it offers international calling at affordable rates. Mobile Dialer allows users to use VoIP or Voice over Internet Protocol on their mobile phones with great ease.

Mobile dialers remove the traditional VoIP limitation of using computer or other VoIP devices restricted to home environment. New generation mobile phone users have access to varieties of internet services like GPRS, 3G and Wi-Fi connections which makes it easy to make VoIP calls from any place in cheaper rate. In that case, users need to install a supportive mobile dialer into their handset.
