= Skinny Client Control Protocol =

Proprietary network terminal control protocol

The Skinny Client Control Protocol (SCCP) is a proprietary network terminal control protocol originally developed by Selsius Systems, which was acquired by Cisco Systems in 1998.

SCCP is a lightweight IP-based protocol for session signaling with Cisco Unified Communications Manager, formerly named CallManager. The protocol architecture is similar to the media gateway control protocol architecture, in that is decomposes the function of media conversion in telecommunication for transmission via an Internet Protocol network into a relatively low-intelligence customer-premises device and a call agent implementation that controls the CPE via signaling commands. The call agent product is Cisco CallManager, which also performs as a signaling proxy for call events initiated over other common protocols such as H.323, and Session Initiation Protocol (SIP) for voice over IP, or ISDN for the public switched telephone network.

== Protocol components ==
An SCCP client uses TCP/IP to communicate with one or more Call Manager applications in a cluster. It uses the Real-time Transport Protocol (RTP) over UDP-transport for the bearer traffic (real-time audio stream) with other Skinny clients or an H.323 terminal. SCCP is a stimulus-based protocol and is designed as a communications protocol for hardware endpoints and other embedded systems, with significant CPU and memory constraints.

Some Cisco analog media gateways, such as the VG248 gateway, register and communicate with Cisco Unified Communications Manager using SCCP.

== Origin ==
Cisco acquired SCCP technology when it acquired Selsius Corporation in 1998. For this reason the protocol is also referred to in Cisco documentation as the Selsius Skinny Station Protocol. Another remnant of the origin of the Cisco IP phones is the default device name format for registered Cisco phones with CallManager. It is SEP, as in Selsius Ethernet Phone, followed by the MAC address. Cisco also has marketed a Skinny-based softphone called Cisco IP Communicator.

== Client examples ==
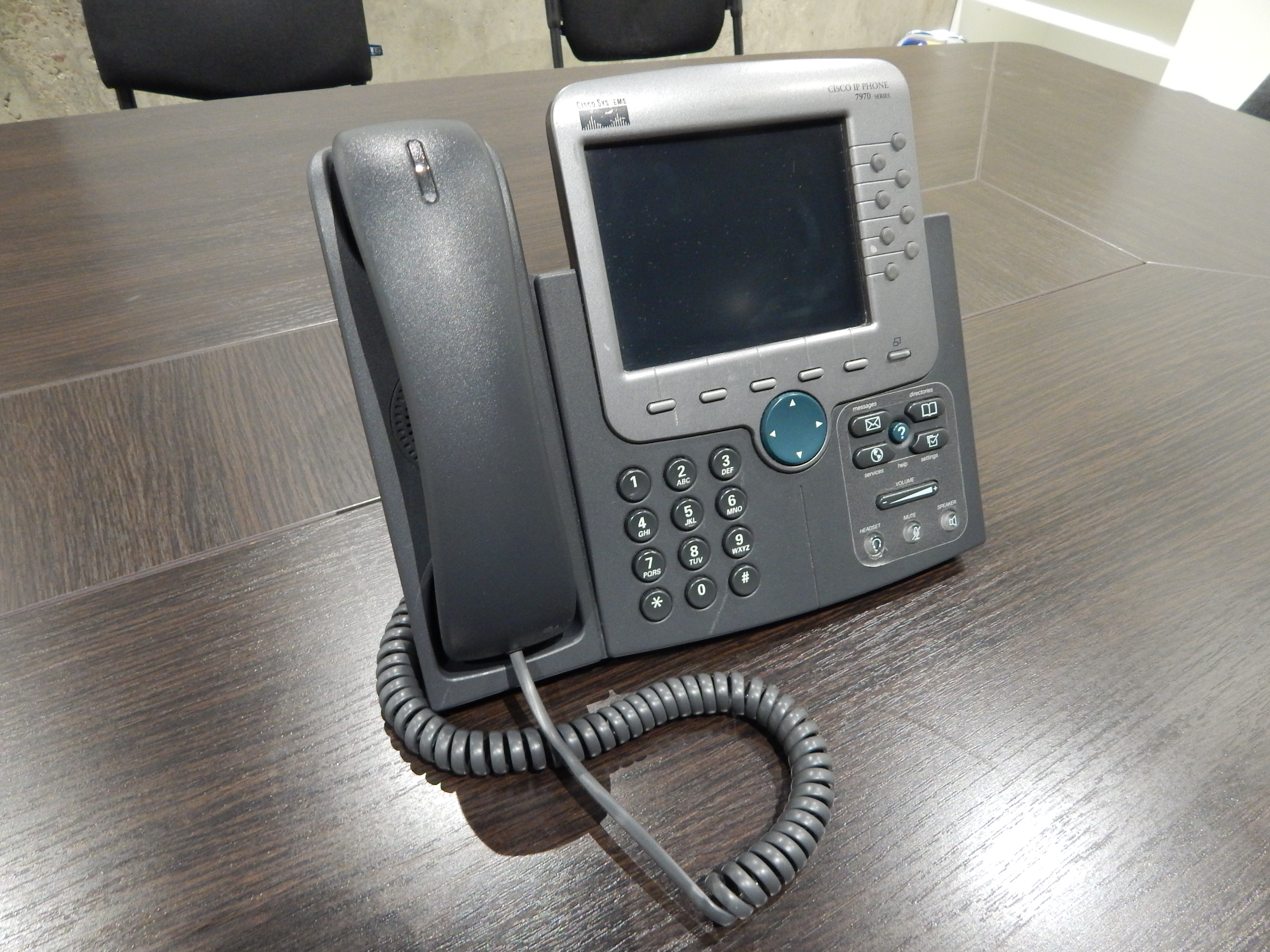
Cisco 7970

Examples of SCCP client devices include the Cisco 7900 series of IP phones, Cisco IP Communicator softphone, and the 802.11b wireless Wireless IP Phone 7920, along with Cisco Unity voicemail server.

== Other implementations ==
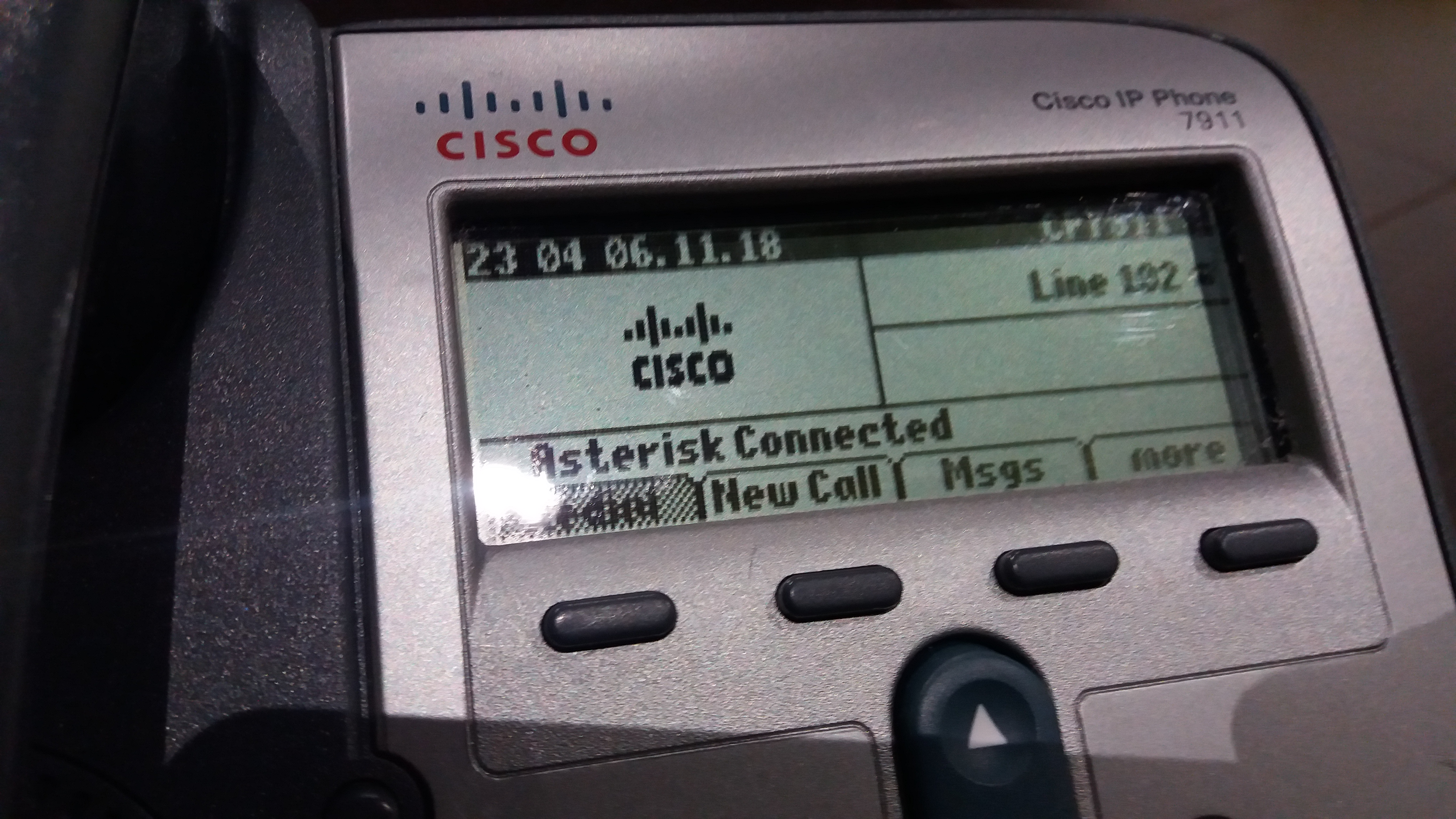
Asterisk connected

Other companies, such as Symbol Technologies, SocketIP, and Digium, have implemented the protocol in VoIP terminals and IP phones, media gateway controllers, and softswitches. An open source implementation of a call agent is available in the Asterisk and FreeSWITCH systems. IPBlue provides a soft phone that emulates a Cisco 7960 telephone. Twinlights Software distributes a soft phone implementation for Android-based devices. The Cisco Unified Application Environment, the product acquired by Cisco when they purchased Metreos, supports using SCCP to emulate Cisco 7960 phones allowing applications to access all Cisco line-side features.

== See also ==
- Media Gateway Control Protocol
