= Rogers Cable and Telecom =

Rogers Cable and Telcom may refer to:

- Rogers Cable
- Rogers Telecom
