= Selsius Systems =

Former telecommunications company

- Company type: Division
- Industry: Computer networking
- Founded: United States (1997)
- Founder: Richard Platt and David Tucker
- Fate: Acquired by Cisco Systems
- Headquarters: United States
- Parent: Cisco Systems
- Website: selsius.com at the Wayback Machine (archived 1998-12-02)

Selsius Systems was a telecommunications company in Dallas, Texas that developed and marketed some of the first IP telephony gear. It was co-founded by Richard Platt and David Tucker. Selsius was incorporated in 1997 and acquired by Cisco Systems in November, 1998.

== Products ==
Selsius designed an IP PBX system consisting of a line of IP phones, a server-based call control application - the Selsius-CallManager, a line of voice over IP gateways and voice applications including voicemail, an automated attendant console and a softphone.

== History ==
Selsius Systems, Inc. was organized in July, 1997 as a wholly owned subsidiary of Intecom, a Dallas-based PBX (Private Branch Exchange) manufacturer, with David C. Tucker as CEO, Richard B. Platt as VP of Engineering and Kevin Brown as VP of Sales and Marketing, as well as numerous other important positions held by the employees of Selsius Systems including John Alexander, Paul Hahn, Dave Corley, Jeff Sanders, and Scott Veibell.

The first commercially available IP phone was the Selsius 30SP. In November, 1997, the company sold five 30SP phones to the TRI lab of Southwestern Bell in San Antonio.

Selsius Systems was borne out of Incite, a division of Intecom, which was a wholly owned subsidiary of Lagardere SCA, a French conglomerate. The Incite team, led by Platt and Tucker, developed and marketed a video PBX. The Incite concept was outlined on a napkin in 1993 and formally organized as a division within Intecom in mid-1994. While Incite's distributed call control software architecture was innovative, the market for a high-end video PBX was not responsive. At Tucker's urging, executives from Intecom and its parent company Matra Communications kept the Incite team together as Selsius was spun out into its own company. Approximately 35 engineers, marketing and sales personnel were part of the original Selsius organization. At the time of the Cisco acquisition, the Selsius team had about 55 employees. From the core call control component of Incite, the Incite Multimedia Manager, grew the Selsius-CallManager, Cisco CallManager, and ultimately Cisco Unified Communications Manager (Unified CM).

Following the acquisition, Platt and Tucker were retained as Cisco executives in the IP Telephony division, directly overseeing the product they helped to create. Nearly all of the original Selsius employees joined the Cisco development organization, except for a few Selsius employees who chose the buy-out rather than continuing on with the product at Cisco. Some original Selsius employees have left Cisco, including Platt and Kevin Brown who, as of 2006, was the CEO of IPcelerate. The CallManager product was still in need of significant work when acquired, often referred to internally within Cisco as "CallManagler" because of its immature feature set.

== Selsius Legacy ==
The current invocation of the Selsius legacy is Cisco Unified Communications Manager and the IP phones which still use (among other protocols) the original protocol created by Selsius engineers to facilitate voice over IP, the Skinny Client Control Protocol (SCCP). Analog gateways, which used the Skinny Gateway Control Protocol (SGCP), have since been end-of-lifed by Cisco. Cisco Unified Communications Manager is the call processing component of the Cisco Unified Communications System. As of 2005, Cisco Unified Communications Manager and related communications products are responsible for approximately $1 billion in revenue for Cisco. Pull-through revenue, i.e. revenue generated on other equipment such as switches and routers as a consequence of selling Cisco Unified Communications Manager to Cisco (from enterprise switches, routers and other network infrastructure components) has been estimated by some to be as high as three times the Cisco Unified Communications Manager-related revenue. In its first year of operation, Selsius sold about 3,000 IP phones. In 2006, Cisco sold 3,000 of its IP phones - an extension of the Selsius legacy - every eight hours.

== Learn More About Selsius ==
Richard Platt wrote the foreword to the first Cisco Press book published on the Unified Communications technology (CallManager, as it was known at that time), titled Cisco CallManager Fundamentals. The book was authored by original Selsius (now Cisco) employees John Alexander, Chris Pearce, Anne Smith, and Delon Whetten. In the foreword, Richard gives an insider's look at the genesis of the Selsius technological advancement: "This was the first time that a telephone call had been made entirely with Internet technology consisting of a true IP phone (connected over Ethernet), over an IP network, managed by an IP-controlled server appropriately named the CallManager." As Richard goes on to say, "This book represents the first book, written by the designers, of the first IP telephony solution ever!" The book's ISBN is 1-58705-008-0 and is now in its second edition.

A Cisco employee, Mark Nelson, has a blog post devoted to Selsius, including photos of the key players Platt, Tucker, Alexander, Sanders, and Hahn. Nelson worked with Richard Platt and other Selsius engineering teams at Cisco immediately after Selsius was acquired by Cisco.

Nortel Networks attempted to acquire Selsius shortly before Cisco successfully acquired Selsius and its employees and technology. The Nortel bid was withdrawn, lacking Selsius employee support for the deal.
