= IPDC =

IPDC may refer to:

- iPhone Developer Conference, the first iOS-Conference in Germany
- Instituto Profissional de Canossa, One of the college in Timor Leste by the Canossa foundation
- IPDC Finance, non-bank financial institution in Bangladesh
- International Programme for the Development of Communication, a UNESCO program
- Internet Protocol Datacasting, which implies Internet Protocol based datacasting (data broadcasting) over radio and television broadcasting networks such as DVB-H
- Islamic Practice & Dawah Circle - IPDC.org.au
- Internet Protocol Device Control, a specification for controlling hardware devices
