= Internet Protocol Device Control =

Internet Protocol Device Control (IPDC) is a 1998 specification of a communications protocol for voice over Internet Protocol (VoIP) telephony, developed by Level 3 Communications.

IPDC divides the operation of telephony gateways between intelligent call routers in an Internet Protocol (IP) network and simple media gateways at the edge of the IP network and the public switched telephone network (PSTN).

Internet Protocol Device Control was fused with the Simple Gateway Control Protocol (SGCP), a project independently in progress at Bellcore, to form the Media Gateway Control Protocol (MGCP). This group of protocols employs the media gateway control protocol architecture that is also the foundation of MEGACO/H.248, a similar protocol which became a standards-track protocol at the Internet Engineering Task Force (IETF).

== See also ==
- Session Initiation Protocol (SIP)
- RTP audio video profile
