= Extension Mobility =

The Cisco Extension Mobility feature, sometimes referred to as hoteling, allows a user to temporarily configure another IP telephone as their own. The user must log into that IP telephone with a username and PIN. Once logged in, the phone has the user's profile information, including their extension number (the reason for calling it ‘extension mobility’), dial permissions and other feature settings (e.g. call forwards).

Extension mobility is often by people who frequently travel between different company locations. They can use any fixed-line phone in the company as if it is their own telephone by logging in. Extension Mobility is also useful in situations where people don’t have a dedicated desk of their own. In a flex-office where people just enter and pick a desk, they can easily register on that desktop phone and use it as theirs. It is convenient since people can use their own features, but also it makes people reachable. The number of missed calls will be minimal.

== The Login Complexity ==
There are a few issues with the use of extension mobility. One must to log into the telephone via the telephone keypad. However, if the username is easy and the PIN is short, this may not be the biggest problem. However, in organizations that use services such as Active Directory (where the username is shared across multiple applications), the user must enter their email address via the telephone keypad.

== Login Alternatives ==
In general, this login issue sometimes results in suboptimal usage, such as when people ‘forget’ to log in or log out. The consequence is that they are either not reachable, or that a telephone can be used unauthorized after the employee leaves his desk.

One option that users have is the possibility to configure the so-called one-click login. Certain user profiles are pre-configured for certain telephones and the user can simply select their profile using a single button. This provides a solution in small teams where people require the flexibility to use their own profile but can completely trust each other.

However, in other situations a software solution like the Active Login Manager may be the solution. Using this client software, the login procedure for the telephone is synchronized with the login of a user's laptop or PC. Whenever the user opens their laptop, the telephone on that same desk is automatically logged in.
