= System access fee =

The system access fee is a non-governmental surcharge imposed by most Canadian telephone companies on their customers' monthly bills. Although it is normally charged for wireless services, Rogers Communications and the now-defunct Sprint Canada also charged its home phone customers a system access fee.

Price for the system access fee varies by carrier and date it was applied with Bell charging between Can$8.95 and $6.95. Rogers normally amounts to $6.95/month (the System Access Fee on Rogers Home Phone Services was $5.95/month, but has since been merged to the base price). For example, if a wireless plan has been advertised at $20/month, the customer subscribing to it would actually be paying an unadvertised rate of at least $26.95/month, excluding other fees and government taxes.

== Government Regulatory Recovery Fee ==
Since October 5, 2009, Rogers Wireless has increased the base cost of all of its monthly plans by $5, and also renamed their former System Access Fee to Government Regulatory Recovery Fee (GRRF). This fee currently ranges from $1.93 to $3.35, depending on the wireless service selected. Rogers clarifies in its fine print that the GRRF "is not a tax or charge the government requires Rogers to collect."

In a press release issued by Virgin Mobile Canada (at the time a joint venture between Rogers' chief competitor Bell Canada and the Virgin Group), Virgin Group chairman Richard Branson, criticized Rogers' Government Regulatory Recovery Fee.

On July 4, 2012, Rogers Wireless included the non-optional and non-governmental GRRF in the price for their monthly plans, such that the charge is no longer listed separately. Bell Mobility's monthly plans are similar to Rogers', so a $2 increase can be found on those plans if client does not subscribe to online billing.

== Criticism ==
The Canadian Government has required Canadian cellular carriers to make it clear that the SAF is not required for any regulatory or government purpose. As a result, the carriers claim that the system access fee covers network operation and maintenance costs. Some critics have argued that the SAF results in much price gouging and should simply be added to the advertised monthly fee instead of being a separate entity and that network upgrades and infrastructure maintenance are simply the costs of doing business. Thus, the monthly plan price point should already reflect that.

== Class action lawsuit ==
In 2006 a class action lawsuit was brought against the major carriers with respect to the System Access Fee. After an initial rejection, it was certified as class action on 7 September 2007 by the Court of Appeal for Saskatchewan. Lawsuits in other provinces, such as British Columbia are also pending.

The Supreme Court of Canada released a ruling on 28 June 2012 that it would not hear an appeal of the Court of Appeal for Saskatchewan decision by the telecommunications companies.
