= Sprint Canada =

Canadian telecommunications provider

- Formerly: Call-Net Enterprises
- Industry: Telecommunications
- Founded: 1993; 33 years ago
- Defunct: 2005; 21 years ago
- Fate: Acquired and merged
- Successor: Rogers Telecom
- Headquarters: Toronto
- Area served: Canada
- Services: landline, long-distance, dial-up Internet access, email, GSM (via Fido)

Sprint Canada was a Canadian telecommunications service provider active from 1993 until 2005, when it was acquired by Rogers Communications. It offered both residential and business services, and was a key company in the long-distance wars of Canada. It was based in Toronto.

== History ==
U.S.-based Sprint Corporation entered the Canadian market in the mid-1990s as a reseller of bulk long-distance telephone lines that it bought from domestic companies. Under Canadian foreign ownership regulations, Sprint could not open its own network. In 1993, Sprint entered into a strategic alliance with Call-Net Enterprises, a Canadian long-distance service, and bought 25 percent of the company. Call-Net's long-distance service was renamed “Sprint Canada”, and expanded to include landline and internet services. In a partnership with Fido Solutions, it offered wireless services.

In 2003, Sprint Canada entered a C$55 million securitization deal with Financity. In 2005, Call-Net and Sprint Canada's 600,000 customers (including 31,000 wireless subscribers) were acquired by Rogers Communications.

== Services ==
Sprint Canada charged a system access fee for all of its services. The home phone, long-distance and Internet services each had a $4.25 fee, while the Sprint and Fido bundles have a $6.95 fee. For clarity purposes, prices stated in this article already include such fees.

=== Landline phone ===
Both traditional and VoIP landline phones were available.

=== Long distance ===
Sprint Canada's flagship product was its long-distance. It was available landline and mobile phones. The rates at the time were very competitive and challenged Bell Canada's monopoly.

=== Internet access ===
Multiple dial-up Internet access options were available for Sprint Canada customers. Both time-limited and unlimited plans were available. "THE MOST online Basic Unlimited" had a cost of $23.20 per month and included a single email address. For an additional $3, one could upgrade to "THE MOST online XTRA", which included Internet call waiting and four additional email addresses. This allowed the customer to answer calls while surfing online.

=== Wireless ===
Sprint Canada had a partnership with Fido Solutions. It consisted of bundling Sprint Canada's landline phone service with Fido's wireless phone service. Sprint's long-distance plans could be used on either or both phones, but Fido month minutes would be deducted for any calls made on the Fido phone.

Two monthly plans were offered, with different allowances for local wireless minutes:

- $51.90 for 150 anytime minutes
- $63.90 for 150 daytime minutes and 1000 evening and weekend minutes
- $71.90 for 300 daytime minutes and 1000 evening and weekend minutes

Daytime minutes could be used from Monday to Friday between 8 am and 7 pm. Evenings and weekend minutes could be used at any time on Saturdays and Sundays, which started at 7 pm Friday and ended at 8 am Monday. From Monday to Friday, they could only be used between 7 pm and 8 am. For Example, Monday at 7 pm to Tuesday at 8 am. If a customer has any unused minutes at the end of a month, they cannot be carried over to the next month.

All plans included call waiting, conference call and 1000 call forwarding minutes. In addition, customers could add two extra calling features at no cost: Caller ID, voicemail, or 50 sent SMS to Canada and the USA. All features could be obtained for $3/month

Sprint Canada's wireless division had 31,000 customers in Q3 2005 before being acquired by Rogers Wireless.

== See also ==
- Rogers Communications
- Fido Solutions
