= PacketCable =

PacketCable network is a technology specification defined by the industry consortium CableLabs for using Internet Protocol (IP) networks to deliver multimedia services, such as IP telephony, conferencing, and interactive gaming on a cable television infrastructure.

The PacketCable technology is based on the DOCSIS base with extensions that enable cable operators to deliver data and voice traffic efficiently using a single high-speed, quality-of-service (QoS)-enabled broadband (cable) architecture.

The PacketCable effort dates back to 1997 when cable operators identified the need for a real-time multimedia architecture to support the delivery of advanced multimedia services over the DOCSIS architecture.

The original PacketCable specifications were based on the physical network characteristics of operators in the U.S. For the European market, Cable Europe Labs, maintains a separate, but equivalent effort, EuroPacketCable, based on European network implementations.

== Technical overview ==
PacketCable interconnects three network types:

- Hybrid Fibre Coaxial (HFC) access network
- Public switched telephone network (PSTN)
- TCP/IP Managed IP networks

=== Protocols ===
- DOCSIS (Data Over Cable Service Interface Specification) - standard for data over cable and details mostly the RF band
- Real-time Transport Protocol (RTP) & Real Time Control Protocol (RTCP) required for media transfer
- PSTN Gateway Call Signaling Protocol Specification (TGCP) which is an MGCP extension for Media Gateways
- Network-Based Call Signaling Protocol Specification (NCS) which is an MGCP extension for analog residential Media Gateways - the NCS specification, which is derived from the IETF MGCP RFC 2705, details VoIP signalling.
  - Basically the IETF version is a subset of the NCS version. The Packet Cable group has defined more messages and features than the IETF.
- Common Open Policy Service (COPS) for quality of service

=== PacketCable voice coders ===
The required coders are:

- ITU G.711 (both μ-law and a-law algorithm versions) - for V1.0 & 1.5
- iLBC - for V1.5
- BV16 - for V1.5

In addition the specifications recommended the following:

- ITU G.728
- ITU G.729 Annex E

=== PacketCable 1.0 ===
PacketCable 1.0 comprises eleven specifications and six technical reports which define call signaling, quality of service (QoS), codec usage, client provisioning, billing event message collection, public switched telephone network (PSTN) interconnection, and security interfaces for implement a single-zone PacketCable solution for residential Internet Protocol (IP) voice services.

=== PacketCable 1.5 ===
PacketCable 1.5 contains additional capabilities over PacketCable 1.0. It superseded previous versions (1.1, 1.2, and 1.3). The standard covers 21 specifications and one technical report which together define call signaling, quality of service (QoS), coders, client provisioning, billing event message collection, PSTN interconnection, and security interfaces for implementing a single-zone or multi-zone PacketCable solution for residential Internet Protocol (IP) voice services.

=== PacketCable 2.0 ===
Version 2.0 introduces IMS Release 7 IP Multimedia Subsystem into the core of the architecture. PacketCable uses a simplified IMS in some areas and enhances it in some cable-specific areas. PacketCable defined Delta specs related to the most important IMS specs from 3GPP.

== Deployment ==
VoIP services based on the PacketCable architecture are being widely deployed by operators:

- B.net (Croatia)
- Cable One (System wide)
- Cabletica (Costa Rica)
- Cablevision – Optimum Voice (System wide)
- Charter (System wide)
- Claro TV (Guatemala, El Salvador, Nicaragua, Honduras)
- Cogeco - Cogeco Home Phone (Canada)
- Comcast - Comcast Digital Voice (System-wide)
- Cox – Cox Digital Telephone (System-wide)
- GCI (Alaska)
- Izzi Telecom (México)
- KabloNet (Turkey)
- Liberty Global (Puerto Rico)
- Net Serviços de Comunicação - NET Serviços de Comunicação (Brasil)
- NetUno (Venezuela)
- NOS (Portugal)
- ONO (Spain)
- Optus - SingTel Optus Pty Ltd (Australia)
- Rogers Telecom (Canada wide (Major cities and towns serviceable with rogers high-speed internet are eligible, still expanding, St John's, NL to Vancouver, BC, serviceable as of July 2007))
- Shaw Communications (Canada: Calgary, Edmonton, Winnipeg and Victoria)
- Shentel (United States: Virginia, West Virginia, Maryland.)
- Telecentro Argentina (Argentina)
- Telenet Group (Belgium)
- TIGO (Honduras, El Salvador, Costa Rica)
- The United Group ("Serbia Broadband" - "Telemach Slovenia" - "Telemach Bosnia and Herzegovina)
- Unitymedia (UPC Germany)
- UPC Broadband (Across Europe)
- Vidéotron (Canada: Quebec)
- Virgin Media Ireland (Ireland)
- Ziggo (The Netherlands)
