= Rogers Telecom =

Canadian company

Rogers Telecom Inc.
- Formerly: Sprint Canada (1993–2005)
- Type: Subsidiary
- Industry: Telecommunications
- Founded: 1986; 40 years ago, in Toronto, Ontario
- Headquarters: Toronto, Ontario
- Key people: See Rogers Communications
- Products: Data, e-business, Voice services
- Revenue: ▲$818 million CAN
- Number of employees: 1,800 (2004)
- Website: rogers.com/homephone

Rogers Telecom Inc. is a subsidiary of Rogers Communications. It is a Canadian company based in Toronto that focuses on integrated communications as a provider of data, e-business and voice services to business and households. It used to be known as Sprint Canada Inc., pursuant to a 1993 branding agreement between parent Call-Net Enterprises Inc. with what is now Sprint Corporation.

In 1998, Call-Net acquired long-distance service and data-circuit provider Fonorola of Montreal for about $1.8 billion and merged it into Sprint Canada.

On May 11, 2005, Rogers Communications Inc. and Call-Net jointly announced that they entered into an agreement under which RCI would acquire 100% of Call-Net under a plan of arrangement. The deal was approved by shareholders and an Ontario court on June 30, 2005, and completed July 1. The deal allowed Rogers to enter the residential phone business to challenge Bell Canada.

On July 7, 2005, Sprint Canada Inc. became Rogers Telecom Inc. and Call-Net Enterprises Inc. became Rogers Telecom Holdings Inc.

== History ==
Sprint Canada was launched in the early 1990s with Candice Bergen as its spokesperson. Bergen also was pitching the products of their U.S. sister company. CallNet licensed the name Sprint from the United States Sprint Corporation up until it was bought out and renamed by Rogers Communications.

== Home Phone service ==
=== Current ===
The Rogers Home Phone service in Canada was launched on July 1, 2005, on the same day that Rogers Telecom was acquired by Rogers Communications Inc. The current offering is VoIP technology using Rogers's Internet cable. A special converter offers home-phone service with traditional RJ11 telephone-line jacks within the house. The VoIP service is currently available in regions served by Rogers Hi-Speed Internet.

This service operates using the PacketCable technology over the company's cable network. Service is delivered by cable to the subscriber's residence and is connected into a home-phone terminal, which then provides the connection to the internal wiring at the address. The home-phone terminal has a six-hour backup and can support up to two different phone numbers.

=== Legacy (2005–2010) ===
The landline service, which was available from mid-2005 to mid-2010, operated switches co-located in the Bell Canada network. As such, Rogers did not maintain the phone lines and was affected by the Bell Subco strike of 2005, which impaired its ability to provide timely service. The same also applied to the Telus strike in Alberta and British Columbia. During the time of the local strikes, Rogers Telecom was not able to provide exact installation dates in those two provinces. Due to legal obligations, however, Rogers's customers received higher-priority service during strikes than actual Bell Canada or Telus customers.

Rogers wanted to discontinue its traditional voice services by the end of 2008. For this reason, Rogers's customers with this service were sent a notice in June 2008. They could either switch to Rogers's VoIP home phone or have their accounts automatically cancelled. However, Rogers did not take these steps until August 2010, when Rogers partnered with Primus Canada. The latter company now manages all traditional home-phone accounts formerly served by Rogers.

== See also ==
- Sprint Nextel Corporation
- Rogers Communications
