= Simple Gateway Control Protocol =

The Simple Gateway Control Protocol (SGCP) is a communications protocol used within a voice over Internet Protocol (VoIP) system. It has been superseded by the Media Gateway Control Protocol (MGCP), another implementation of the media gateway control protocol architecture.

The Simple Gateway Control Protocol was published in several Internet Engineering Task Force (IETF) draft versions between May and July 1998 by Mauricio Arango and Christian Huitema, at Telcordia Technologies (formerly Bellcore). The protocol architecture decomposes a telecommunications gateway located at the boundary between the public switched telephone network and an Internet Protocol (IP) network, such as the Internet, into a media gateway controller (MGC) on the IP network, providing call and device control, and multiple media gateways (MGs) that handle the actual media conversion to the analog or digital circuits of the PSTN, or simply connect residential telephones. Other implementations of the architecture refer to the controller as a softswitch. Communication between multiple media gateway controllers is handled by other protocols, such as the Session Initiation Protocol (SIP).

Shortly after its publication, SGCP was merged with the Internet Protocol Device Control (IPDC) proposal sponsored by Level3 Communications in the Fall of 1998. This led to the definition of the Media Gateway Control Protocol, jointly submitted to the IETF by the authors of SGCP and IPDC in October 1998. MGCP was used as a conceptual basis with additions from the Media Gateway Device Protocol by Lucent resulting in the Megaco/H.248 protocol, which gained formal standards-level status at the IETF and the International Telecommunication Union (ITU).
