= Self-Help Group for Cerebral Palsy =

Disability organization based in Nepal

Self Help Group for Cerebral Palsy Nepal
- Formation: 1987
- Type: non-profit organization
- Headquarters: Lalitpur
- Location: Nepal
- Affiliations: International Cerebral Palsy Society, London
- Website: http://www.cpnepal.org/

The Self-Help Group for Cerebral Palsy (SGCP) is a non-governmental and non-profit organization in Nepal dedicated for helping and educating children and adults with cerebral palsy. Cerebral palsy (CP) is a neurological disorder that is caused during childhood which permanently affects body movement and muscle coordination. The organization has one rehabilitation center established in 2005, situated in Dhapakel, Lalitpur that consists of a team of medical professionals, trained teachers and social workers.

== History ==
SGCP is an associate organization member of the International Cerebral Palsy Society. The organization was established in 1987 with 6 children with CP. It was the first organization in Nepal dedicated to provide physical and morale support to the children. Through the study conducted by Kathmandu University, SGCP is the only organization in Nepal that consists of specialist medical, therapeutic and educational care and support for children affected by CP.

== Objective ==
The main objective of the SGCP is to provide medical care, educational support and counseling to children with CP and their parents. It aims at helping the parents through different interventions so that their children receive effective care on a long-term basis and become independent within the limits of their abilities.

The objectives of the organization are:

- Helping children and adults to be self-reliant through appropriate treatment
- To motivate the parents of the children with CP and to provide support to them on a long-term basis
- Supporting the children through proper use of available community resources by maintaining close rapport with the parents
- To conduct training for teachers and other workers for providing rehabilitation services for the children
- Promoting public awareness for the prevention of CP
- To analyze and apply the knowledge and skills of the research findings of international agencies for improving the treatment of CP affected children in Nepal

== Foundation ==
SGCP is an associate organization member of International Cerebral Palsy Society (ICPS). ICPS was founded in Great Britain in 1969. It has 140 members in 49 countries. The member consists of 35 national cerebral palsy organizations, 15 institutions and many professional organizations. ICPS aims at providing welfare to the people with CP and to advance development in all fields related to CP, especially in developing countries which are lacking behind in its treatment. It has conducted researches for the prevention, co-operation and understanding of the treatment of people with CP.

== Facilities ==
The SGCP organization provides service through the SGCP school and rehabilitation center. Most of the trained teachers at the center are parents of the children attending the SGCP School. The rehabilitation center provides diagnosis, therapy, parental counseling and monthly check-ups for the children while the SCGP School provides the children with education and motivates them to become independent.

== Programmes and activities ==
The SGCP runs a number of programmes:

=== Special Education Programme ===
The Special Education Programme (SEP) started in 1993 which aimed at providing primary education and cognitive development processes for the children with CP. The children are assigned individual work, involved in group activities and given physiotherapy. Each child has an individual plan according to their abilities and capacities.

=== Cerebral Palsy Rehabilitation Centre ===
This centre mainly aims at educating the parents of children with CP and providing them with practical skills so that they are able to support their children at home in order to avoid problems which might affect the development of the child. The services include medical assessment and counseling by pediatric doctors, physiotherapy, speech therapy, occupation therapy and distribution of medicines to clients who have epilepsy.

=== Outreach Programme ===
This is a home based programme which extends its support to the CP affected children in the outer district of Nepal which do not have access to the rehabilitation center. This programme has active access to 21 districts of 75 in Nepal. It consists of a group of trained home visitors to teach basic therapy skills and simulation techniques to parents of children with CP.

=== Home Visit Programme ===
The Home Visit Programme consists of trained visitors who visit the homes of the children with CP. The main function of this programme is to involve the parents in the rehabilitation process, to teach the parents how to help their children through therapeutic exercises and to keep a record of the home environment of the child with CP.

=== Awareness Programme ===
The organization conducts Awareness Programmes in order to make people familiar to cerebral palsy. It initiates activities such as the orientation programs, putting posters in hospitals and public places and dissemination the information through electronic media and TV.

=== Establishment of Care Centers ===
The organization has a care center at Dhapakhel, however, it is not enough for the large number of cases. The organization is instrumental in opening nine other centers through establishing Parents, Groups and networking with local organizations, in Kathmandu valley and outside in districts. SGCP provides technical support and guidance while parents and the partner organizations are responsible for the management and running of the center.

== Criticism ==
Though SGCP has provided support and medical assistance to the children affected by CP, it still lacks in many areas. It has not been able to extend its capacity in order to incorporate more children with CP as chronically the organization lacks funds. This is a major problem as most of parents of the CP children refuse to invest in children with cerebral palsy because they think there is no return on the investment. There are very few medical professional who are trained to diagnose people with CP, hence, the organization has few physiotherapists who also work as occupational and speech therapists. This explains their inability of increasing their capacity to include more children with CP. Situation Analysis of Disability in Nepal estimates the national prevalence of disability is 1.63 per cent of the total population and about 68.2 per cent of all disabled people have no education.
