= Softswitch =

Software based telecommunications call routing

A softswitch (software switch) is a call-switching node in a telecommunications network, based not on the specialized switching hardware of the traditional telephone exchange, but implemented in software running on a general-purpose computing platform. Like its traditional counterparts it connects telephone calls between subscribers or other switching systems across a telecommunication network. Often a softswitch is implemented to switch calls using voice over IP (VoIP) technologies, but hybrid systems exist.

Although the term softswitch technically refers to any such device, it is conventionally applied to a device that handles IP-to-IP phone calls, while the phrase access server or "media gateway" is used to refer to devices that either originate or terminate traditional land line phone calls. In practice, such devices can often do both. An access server might take a mobile call or a call originating from a traditional telephone line, convert it to IP traffic, then send it over an IP network to another such device, which terminates the call by reversing the process and converting the voice over IP call to circuit-switched digital systems using traditional digital time-division multiplexing (TDM) or analog POTS protocols.

The call agents are the software switching elements of the softswitch. Other components handle functions for billing, directory services, network signaling. The network elements that convert voice streams between VoIP links and traditional media technologies, such as analog telephone lines, pair-gain devices, carrier systems, are called media gateways. A call agent may control many different media gateways in geographically dispersed areas via an IP network.

The softswitch generally resides in a building owned by a telephone company, called a telephone exchange or central office, or in a data center. Such locations have high capacity connections to carry telephone calls or digital communication to other switching centers.

Access devices to the services of a softswitch range from large media gateways with high port density to integrated access devices (IAD) at office locations, to small analog telephone adaptors (ATA) which provide just one RJ11 telephone jack to a residence. Embedded multimedia terminal adapters (eMTAs) are also built into cable television modems.

A softswitch routes telephone calls using the Signalling System No. 7 (SS7) network. SS7 modules may be implemented directly in the softswitch, or accessed from standalone signaling servers.

At the turn of the 21st century with IP Multimedia Subsystem (IMS), the softswitch element is represented by the media gateway controller (MGC) element, while the term softswitch is rarely used in the IMS context, where it is called an access gateway control function (AGCF).

== Class 4 and Class 5 softswitches ==
VoIP softswitches are subdivided into Class 4 and Class 5 systems, in analogy to the traditional functions in the public switched telephone network.

Softswitches used for transit VoIP traffic between carriers are usually called Class 4 softswitches. Analogous with other Class 4 telephone switches, the main function of the Class 4 softswitch is the routing of large volumes of long-distance VoIP calls. The most important characteristics of Class 4 softswitch are protocol support and conversion, transcoding, calls per second rate, average time of one call routing, number of concurrent calls.

Class 5 softswitches are intended to serve subscribers. Class 5 softswitches are characterized by additional services for end-users and corporate clients such as IP PBX features, call center services, calling card platform, types of authorization, QoS, Business Groups and other features similar to other Class 5 telephone switches.

== See also ==
- Telephone switch
- Software defined mobile network
