= Media gateway =

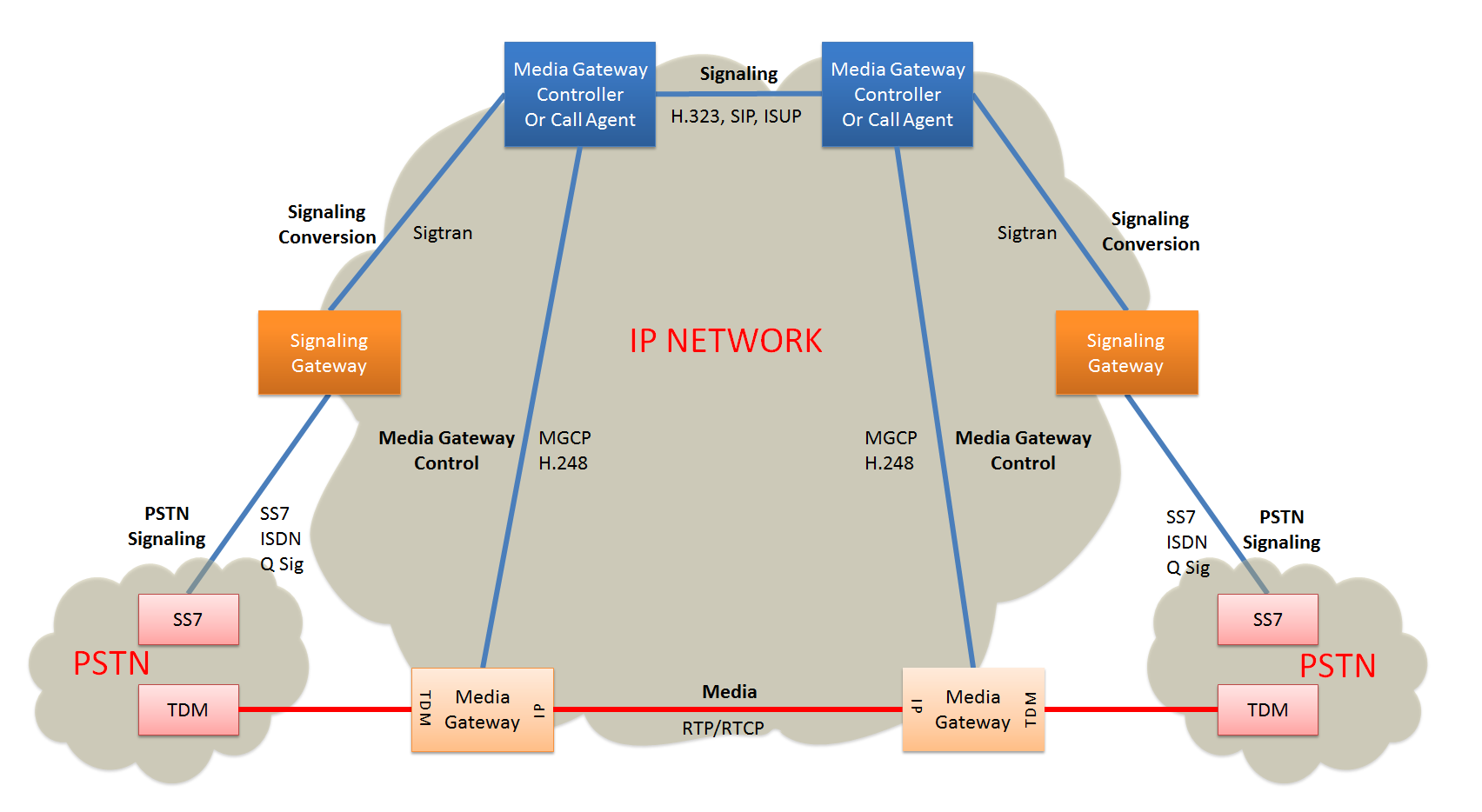
Media Gateways are used for transcoding media between PSTN and IP networks

A media gateway is a translation device or service that converts media streams between disparate telecommunications technologies such as POTS, SS7, Next Generation Networks (2G, 2.5G and 3G radio access networks) or private branch exchange (PBX) systems. Media gateways enable multimedia communications across packet networks using transport protocols such as Asynchronous Transfer Mode (ATM) and Internet Protocol (IP).

Because the media gateway connects different types of networks, one of its main functions is to convert between different transmission and coding techniques. Media streaming functions such as echo cancellation, DTMF, and tone sender are also located in the media gateway.

Media gateways are often controlled by a separate Media Gateway Controller which provides the call control and signaling functionality. Communication between media gateways and Call Agents is achieved by means of protocols such as MGCP or Megaco (H.248) or Session Initiation Protocol (SIP). Modern media gateways used with SIP are often stand-alone units with their own call and signaling control integrated and can function as independent, intelligent SIP end-points.

Voice over Internet Protocol (VoIP) media gateways perform the conversion between Time-division multiplexing (TDM) voice to a media streaming protocol, such as the Real-time Transport Protocol, (RTP), as well as a signaling protocol used in the VoIP system.

Mobile access media gateways connect the radio access networks of a public land mobile network PLMN to a next-generation core network. 3GPP standards define the functionality of CS-MGW and IMS-MGW for UTRAN and GERAN based PLMNs.

== See also ==
- Signaling gateway
