= Broadvox Communications =

Broadvox.com
- Company type: subsidiary of Onvoy LLC
- Founded: 2001; 25 years ago
- Headquarters: Cleveland, Ohio, U.S.
- Key people: Fritz Hendricks, CEO, Surendra Saboo, COO
- Products: Telecommunications, SIP Trunking, VoIP
- Number of employees: 100+
- Website: www.onvoy.com

Broadvox is a VoIP service provider for business telecommunications. It offers voice and data network solutions for telecommunications, cable, and wireless carriers, as well as ISPs, ITSPs, Over-the-top (OTT) service providers, MVNOs, and various other business partners. Broadvox operates its own nationwide competitive local exchange carrier (CLEC) facilities.

Broadvox was founded in 2001 as a wholesale VoIP carrier and is headquartered in Cleveland, Ohio with additional offices in Atlanta, Georgia and Dallas, Texas. In 2003, Broadvox began offering SIP origination and termination, which increased the companies quality of the voice transmission and expanded service offerings. In 2007, Broadvox added retail SIP Trunking to its product offerings for SMB, enterprise and carrier customers. In 2015, Broadvox was acquired by Onvoy.

== Google Voice ==
In October 2009, Documents were released by the FCC regarding Google Voice and details pertaining to growth and expansion of Google's Voice Product. Details also included network operations which listed Broadvox and other SIP Trunking Companies that help Google Voice infrastructure

== Products ==
Broadvox provides a variety of business VoIP products and services. The products include:

- Call origination services – toll free
- Call termination services– toll free and A-Z termination
- SMS
- Local Routing Number (LRN) service
- CNAM (caller ID) submission and dipping
- e911
- Voice peering

== Network ==
Broadvox has a 10G carrier-grade network that carries over 20 billion annual minutes of voice and data. The company uses high density hardware and technology from Sonus Networks, Juniper Networks, and Cisco Systems. It also has core switching centers in New York, Los Angeles, Chicago, Dallas, Miami, Atlanta, Denver, Toronto and Seattle.

It is a Tier 1 network that has coverage in the continental United States, Hawaii, Puerto Rico, the U.S. Virgin Islands, and Canada. In addition to a large network, Broadvox provides U.S. based customer service—including 24/7 Tier I and II carrier support. Broadvox was the first carrier to have a customized online user portal for provisioning and requesting phone numbers as well as reviewing account info.

== Acquisitions and takeover ==
On January 6, 2014, Fusion acquired the Broadvox cloud services business, including all cloud-based voice, unified communications and SIP trunking products, for $32.1 million.

On September 3, 2015, Onvoy (which already operates as a CLEC and acquired assets of Vitelity) acquired the remaining Broadvox businesses.

== See also ==
- Session Initiation Protocol (SIP)
- VoIP
