= TalkSwitch =

Canadian communications company

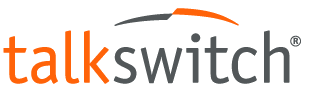
- Company type: Private
- Industry: Telecommunications
- Founded: 1990
- Headquarters: Ottawa, Ontario, Canada
- Key people: President and CEO: Jan Scheeren
- Products: Telephone systems for small businesses, Analog and IP telephones, Productivity applications
- Number of employees: 65 (2007)
- Parent: www.fortinet.com

TalkSwitch was a company that designed and built telephone systems for small and multi-location businesses. The company's Private branch exchange (PBX) and hybrid IP-PBX products enable communication over telephone and Voice over IP (VoIP) networks.

== Corporate history ==
TalkSwitch was founded in Ottawa, Ontario, Canada in 1990 by entrepreneurs Jan Scheeren and Glen Collie. The men recognized that traditional telephone system manufacturers had been largely ignoring the small business market, forcing those companies to settle for scaled down versions of their big business systems. They worked on a system that would be less expensive than a traditional PBX system and could be installed, configured and maintained by its end users. TalkSwitch was acquired by Fortinet in April 2011.

The company launched the Concero Switchboard in 1996. The Concero was a small PBX with capacity for 2 incoming phone lines and 4 local extensions. It provided automatic fax detection, automated attendants, built-in voicemail and a host of other features that were beneficial to small businesses. It received several awards but did not sell well due to lack of exposure.

Centerpoint Technologies launched the TalkSwitch line in 2000. Building this new system from the ground up, TalkSwitch systems offered an expanded feature set over what Concero had, and were designed to grow with a user's business. The sales of this system were much better because they were able to gain a high ranking on Google. They were also built on a new software platform that allowed the company to launch its first Voice over IP products in March 2004.

In November 2006, the company introduced its TalkSwitch VS line, which added new expansion and configuration options. For the first time, customers could set local extensions as either analog or IP, establishing TalkSwitch as one of the first truly hybrid systems on the market.

They can be used as standalone devices, or in a network and can combine both traditional telephone lines and VoIP services, using analog and/or IP phones. The company has interoperability partnerships with a number of leading VoIP service providers including Primus, Covad, Bandwidth.com, Broadvoice and SureWest.

TalkSwitch was acquired by Fortinet in April 2011, and in 2012 its products are sold as the FortiVoice product line.

=== Partial list of software products ===
In April 2007, TalkSwitch introduced its Attendant Console application, the first software application built to augment its line of phone systems. The Attendant Console allows users to monitor and manage calls directly from their PCs, without requiring any additional hardware.

In August 2007 the company then launched its Call Reporting Software, which is used to generate detailed reports on all telephone system activity. Every activity on a TalkSwitch system can be tracked and reported on. Users are able to assign built-in account codes so they can accurately bill clients for telephone charges, and management can monitor the real-time call activity of particular departments.
