= Phone Power =

Voice over IP service provider

Phone Power LLC
- Company type: Private
- Industry: Communications Services
- Founded: 2005
- Founder: Jim Murphy and Ari Ramenzani
- Headquarters: Winnetka, California, USA
- Products: VoIP
- Services: Telephone Services (VoIP)
- Website: www.phonepower.com

Phone Power is an American privately owned commercial voice over IP (VoIP) company, based in Winnetka, California that provides telephone service over the Internet via a broadband connection.

== History ==
A privately owned company founded in 2005, Phone Power provides telecommunications service in 48 states in the U.S. Phone Power's customer service is based in the USA. Customers of Phone Power vary from single-line residential service to corporate call centers and SIP Trunking. The company promotes itself with the slogan "communications evolved" in the United States. Founded in Canoga Park, CA, Phone Power is now located in Winnetka, CA. The company currently offers service throughout the U.S. and Canada. In the US is one of the most popular providers, the largest privately held VoIP provider and a direct competition to incumbents. In Canada Phone Power has a growing subscriber base, with a marked increase in Phone Power popularity.

== In the news ==
In September 2009, Phone Power announced the acquisition of all residential Broadvox Direct VoIP customers. With this acquisition, Phone Power expanded its coverage into Canada.

In November 2009 Best Buy and Phone Power announced the availability of the Phone Power Retail Combo Pack in all Best Buy stores in the USA.

In January 2010 Phone Power and Fry's Electronics announced a distribution deal to distribute Phone Power's products in Fry's stores nationwide

Acme Packet mentioned Phone Power as one of its next generation customers utilizing their Net-Net 4250 session border controllers in its Q4 2009 Earnings Call with investors. In February 2010, Acme Packet reported that Phone Power had deployed its larger Net-Net 4500 session border controllers to bypass the traditional Class 4 switching.

In August 2010, Metaswitch highlighted Phone Power as one of their first all IP customers and featured them in one of their first "Built On Metaswitch" promotional videos.

In October 2010, Phone Power announced the acquisition of VOIP.com customers. The VOIP.com brand co-exists independently with the Phone Power brand.

In August 2011, Innomedia announced a large purchase order of VoIP adapters from Phone Power.

On May 2, 2012, Phone Power alerted customers that they were experiencing a Denial-of-service attack on their website. Service was temporarily interrupted to customers, but was fully restored that afternoon. They reported on their Twitter account that problem reported to FBI.

In March 2014, Obihai Technology advised clients using Obihai analog telephone adapters with Google Voice that they should switch to rival vendors Phone Power or Anveo under the OBiTALK Approved Service Provider Program as Google's removal of XMPP support would disrupt use of their ATA with that service. Official Obihai support for Google Voice returned September 11, 2014.

== Products ==
In 2009, Phone Power introduced "free 60 minutes of international calling" to select destinations on any plan that offered 3,000 minutes or more. In 2010, Phone Power introduced the Global Plus Add On plan for international calling. This allowed an additional 1200 minutes to those same countries. In January 2011, Phone Power launched its free iPhone App, allowing customers to use the included international calling on their mobile phones. The company also offered a "Zippy" USB adapter which could be used in addition to the home adapter, allowing use of the service while traveling (The "Zippy" USB adapter has since been discontinued). The "Zippy" USB adapter was replaced with a stand-alone Softphone that can be used from any Windows or Apple computer with a microphone and speakers. The softphone is a free download.

== VoIP requirements ==
For home use, customers use a "Phone Power" "VoIP router" (or their own supplied hardware) that connects to their main router or broadband modem. An upload speed of 128 kbps and a download speed of 768 kbit/s is the minimum requirement for reliable quality of service without sub-standard call quality.

== Telephone number availability and portability ==
Subscribers select a number in the U.S. for their primary line, in an area code unrelated to their actual residence. Subscribers can obtain additional "virtual numbers" for a monthly fee. While the company supports porting a U.S. telephone number via the U.S. Federal Communications Commission's local number portability, not every phone number is available in every area code. Residents of the U.S. and Canada may subscribe to Phone Power by credit card, debit card, or pre-paid credit card.

== Emergency calls ==
One difference between a Plain Old Telephone Service (POTS), and Voice Over IP is the way they are registered for 9-1-1 Emergency Services. With POTS, the telephone number is forever associated with a single address and that address is registered with the appropriate regional 9-1-1 database. Voice Over IP allows more mobility than POTS, since your number can be tied to a small piece of hardware or software that can travel from place to place. This mobility is addressed with E911, or Enhanced 9-1-1. Phone Power allows the customer to change their address for 9-1-1 over the internet, allowing for near instantaneous updating of the regional 9-1-1 database.

Phone Power does have a Failsafe Number Feature that will forward incoming calls to the Phone Power number to an alternate number in the event their system cannot send those calls to the Phone Power device. (e.g., customer Internet outage, power outage, etc.)

== See also ==
- SIP Trunking
- Mobile VoIP
- IP Phone
- G711
- G.722
- T.38
