= BroadVoice =

American communications services company

Broadvoice Inc.
- Type: Private
- Industry: Communications services
- Founded: December 2003; 22 years ago in Lowell, Massachusetts
- Headquarters: Northridge, California
- Products: Voice over IP
- Number of employees: 350
- Website: broadvoice.com

Broadvoice is a privately owned company headquartered in Northridge, California. They provide Voice over IP (VOIP) cloud-based telecommunications services to small, medium, and enterprise businesses in the United States. Broadvoice offers telephone services, unified communications as a service (UCaaS), SIP Trunking, telecommunications network and security, along with virtual call centers, so business customers can use voice and video communications via a broadband Internet connection or cellular phone.

== History ==
Broadvoice started as a pager company, Rampage Cellular, in the San Fernando Valley in the early 1990s. After the Northridge Earthquake in 1994, its founders Jim Murphy and Ari Ramenzani lost all their inventory stored in their apartment due to flooding of an aquarium, and used the funds from FEMA to lease their first office. This led to the founding of DSL Extreme, a residential broadband internet provider, in 1999.

After the sale of DSL Extreme in 2005 Jim and Ari founded Phone Power in 2005, a residential VOIP Telecommunications service offering telephone services throughout the United States and Canada.

In 2012, Phone Power acquired Broadvoice; that same year, Phone Power rebranded itself as Broadvoice.

Before the acquisition by Phone Power, Broadvoice was a subsidiary of Convergent Networks, which was founded in December 2003 by David Epstein and Nathan Stratton and was based in the Billerica, Massachusetts area as of 2008. Convergent was purchased by Eastern Photonics, a subsidiary of Global NAPs, a competitive local exchange carrier.

Jim Murphy is the CEO of Broadvoice. Sam Ghahremanpour is president and is responsible for corporate strategy, business development, and brand development. George Mitsopoulos is the chief operating officer (COO). He joined Broadvoice with the re-acquisition of IKANO's Broadband internet provider DSL Extreme in 2015. In 2025, Gurdip Jande was named the Chief Product Officer.

== Products and services ==
=== B-hive ===
Broadvoice's b-hive virtual call center platform combines UCaaS, Contact Center, Cloud PBX and communication tools. The platforms allow users to review and manage call flows through real-time analytics, call routing, call recording, auto attendants, conference call setup, manager users and the added ability to use the Android and iPhone application to make and receive calls.

=== Cloud PBX ===
Broadvoice provides cloud-based VOIP services for businesses. Cloud PBX services do not require an onsite PBX system. They offer features that include voicemail, online faxing, remote office capabilities, mobile applications and softphones.

=== SIP Trunking ===
Broadvoice SIP Trunking for businesses allows for equipment already owned to be used. Additional features include call recording, inbound call analytics and unlimited usage options.

=== Network and Security ===
Broadvoice offers managed firewall, cyber security, and related support.

=== UCaas ===
Broadvoice Unified Communication as a service suite offers SMS and text messaging, softphone, advance calling features, web-based communicator tool, call logs, voicemail, faxing, and admin call center analytics.

=== Government ===
In November 2016, Broadvoice was awarded government contractor status.

== Awards ==
- Listed in the San Fernando Valley Business Journal in 2013, 2014, 2016 and 2017.
- On Deloitte's list of the top fastest growing technology companies in North America.
- Awarded as one of the fastest-growing companies in the United States by Inc 500|5000's annual list for 2015, 2016, and 2017 business growth.
- Earned the Stevie Award for business development Achievement of the Year in the technology industry.
- Awarded with the Bronze Stevie Award for Telecom Service Department of the Year in 2017.
- Received a 2018 Internet telephony award for b-hive.
- Received the Channel Partners Choice award in May 2018 for being recognized as a supplier for innovation in their channel partner programs.

== Acquisitions ==
In April 2017, Broadvoice acquired XBP, a development-oriented company with a focus on virtual PBX and contact center offerings. This acquisition has allowed Broadvoice to provide a better customer user experience and has allowed for new features with the launch of its new platform b-hive.

In August 2018, Broadvoice acquired YipTel, a Utah-based UCaaS provider.

In July 2021, Broadvoice acquired GoContact, a Portugal-based provider of cloud contact center software.

== See also ==
- Session Initiation Protocol (SIP)
- VoIP
