= PacWest =

PacWest can refer to:

- Pacific West Conference, an intercollegiate college athletic conference affiliated with NCAA Division II
- Pacific Western Athletic Association, an intercollegiate college athletic conference affiliated with the CCAA
- PacWest Bancorp, parent company of Pacific Western Bank in Los Angeles, California, United States
- PacWest Center, a 29-story office building in Portland, Oregon
- PacWest Racing, Bruce McCaw's Champ Car racing team in operation from 1993 to 2002
- Pac-West Telecomm, a wholesale telecommunications carrier headquartered in Oakland, California
- Pacific Western University (Hawaii), also called American PacWest International University, an unaccredited school in operation from 1988 to 2006.
- The Western Collegiate Athletic Association, a former NCAA Division I women's sports conference known as the "Pacific West Conference" in its final season of 1985–86
