= Sipura Technology =

VoIP technology company

Sipura Technology, Inc.
- Industry: Voice over IP
- Founded: 2003; 23 years ago
- Defunct: April 26, 2005
- Fate: Acquired by Cisco Systems
- Headquarters: San Jose, California, United States
- Website: sipura.net at the Wayback Machine (archived 2005-02-08)

Sipura Technology, Inc. was a voice-over-IP (VoIP) startup company based in San Jose, California founded in 2003 with its siblings VideoCore Technology, Inc. and Komodo Technology, Inc. Sipura made VoIP telephone adapters including the Sipura Phone Adapter SPA2100, SPA3000, SPA9000, as well as SPA series IP phones, like the SPA941.

Cisco Systems acquired VOIP maker Sipura Technologies for its Linksys division on April 26, 2005. Sipura released its SPA series equipment under the Linksys brand up until when Linksys was sold. However, Cisco kept the rights to Sipura. And sold the SPA series under the name "Cisco Small Business" for several years. In 2016 Cisco released their 7800 and 8800 series IP phones and produced "3PCC" models running updated versions of firmware originally made by Sipura.

== Products ==
- SPA2000: Basic analog telephone adapter (ATA) that allows two plain old telephone service (POTS) phones or fax machines to be connected to an Ethernet network in order to make and receive telephone calls or faxes.
- SPA2100: Similar to the SPA2000 with the addition of an Ethernet router. Functions of the built-in router include QoS.
- SPA3000: The SPA3000 has one analog telephone adapter port (FXS) and one FXO port for connection to the public switched telephone network.
- SPA3102: Similar to the SPA3000, it includes a single LAN output that can be connected to a computer. This is useful if the user has an ISP modem but no router. The SPA3102 connects to the LAN socket on the ISP modem, and the computer directly to the LAN connection on the SPA3102. The SPA3102, effectively, is an analog telephone adapter (ATA) and single output router in one box.
- SPA9000: An IP PBX system with auto-attendants, hunt groups, telephone extensions, and POTS connectors. The SPA9000 also has basic router functionality including port forwarding, quality of service, and DTMF configurability.
- SPA901: A single-line VoIP telephone.
- SPA921: A single-line VoIP telephone with LCD screen.
- SPA922: A single-line VoIP telephone with LCD screen and built in Ethernet switch.
- SPA941: Flagship four-line VoIP telephone with LCD screen.
- SPA942: A four-line VoIP telephone, similar in appearance and functionality to the SPA941, with the additions of power over Ethernet capability, backlit LCD screen, and a single port built-in Ethernet switch.
- SPA962: A six-line VoIP telephone, similar in appearance and functionality to the SPA941 and SPA942, with the addition of a six line, 2-inch color LCD screen.

== See also ==
- Obihai Technology
