= Obihai Technology =

Telecommunications equipment company

- Type: Private corporation
- Industry: computer networking
- Founded: 2010 in Cupertino, California
- Fate: sold to Polycom, with Poly then sold to HP
- Headquarters: Campbell, California, United States
- Products: analog telephone adapters, softphones
- Brands: Obi, ObiTALK, OBiON
- Parent: Polycom
- Website: obihai.com at the Wayback Machine (archived 2017-06-01)

Obihai Technology was a company that manufactured analog telephone adapters, supporting Session Initiation Protocol (SIP), XMPP, and Google Voice compatible Internet telephony. Obihai was sold to Polycom in 2018, with Poly and Plantronics sold to HP in 2022. Most items in the former Obihai product line have been either rebranded as Poly or discontinued.

== History ==
The company, based in California's Silicon Valley, was founded in 2010 by Jan Fandrianto and Sam Sin, the same people who introduced the first analog telephone adaptors as Komodo Technology in the 1990s and formed Sipura Technology in 2002. Both prior companies were acquired by Cisco Systems, in 2000 and 2005 respectively, and integrated into that company's Linksys division. Linksys was sold to Belkin in 2013.

In January 2018, Polycom acquired Obihai. In 2022, Poly was sold onwards to HP.

In December 2021, Obahai's consumer-oriented analogue telephone adapter line was discontinued, with support ended in December 2023.

The OBiTALK Consumer Portal shut down on October 31, 2024, affecting all connected devices. While most OBiHAI devices may still function temporarily, the eventual expiration of security certificates will end their integration with Google Voice.

== Products ==
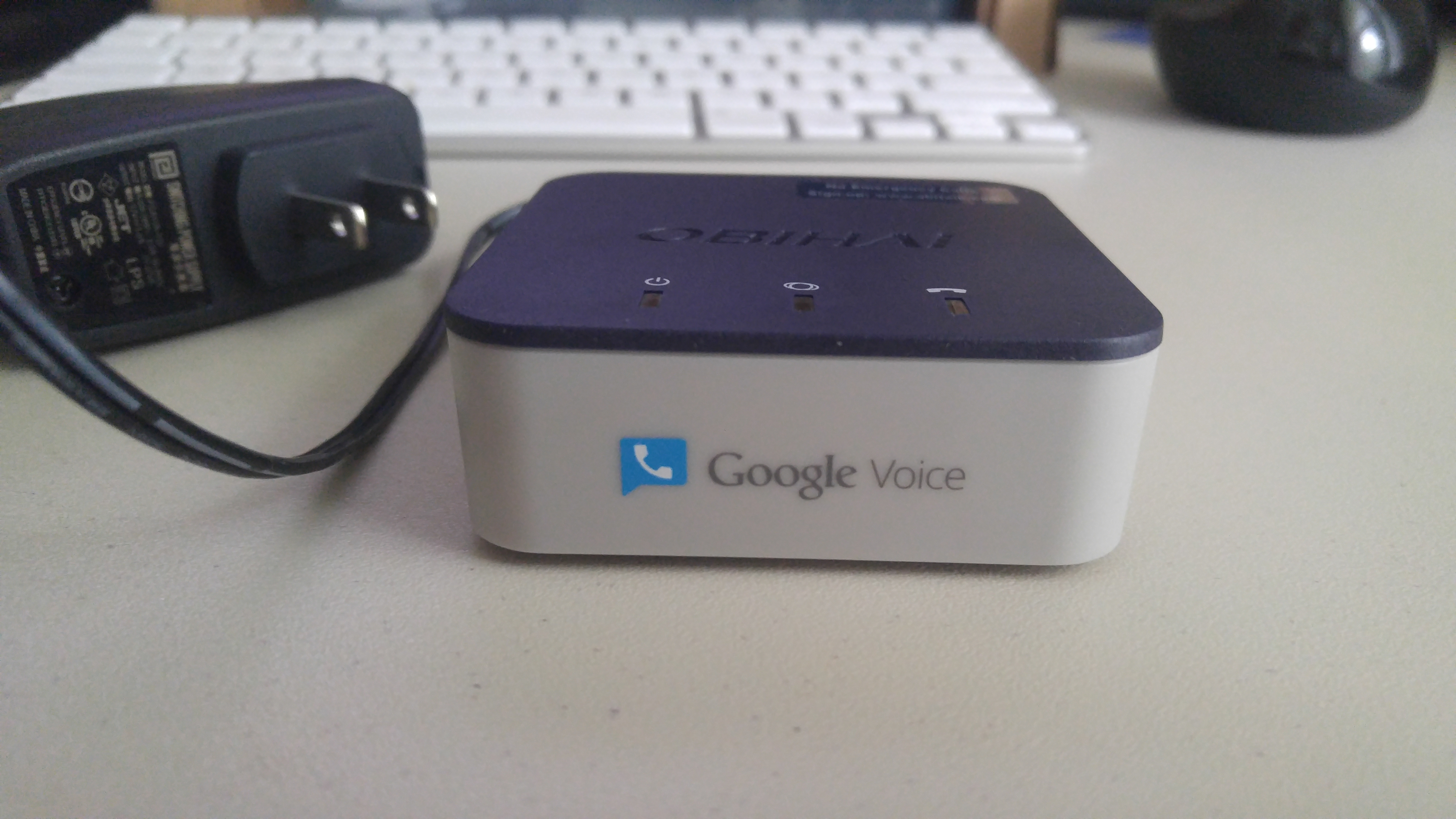
The Obi200 produced by Obihai Technologies and branded by Google Voice. Front face.

Obihai was notable primarily for manufacturing analog telephone adapters connecting standard push-button telephones to the Google Voice service using a wired or wireless broadband Internet connection. As Google's voice over IP service is inexpensive (and, in some cases, was free), hardware allowing the service to replace conventional landline telephony reduced costs to subscribers.

The hardware came in various configurations, including OBi100 (1 x FXS, to connect to one phone), OBi110 (1 FXS + 1 FXO, to connect to one phone and one conventional outside line), OBi200 (1 x FXS, 4x VoIP services, T.38, USB, [wi-fi, BT optional extra]) and OBi202 (2 FXS + LAN with T.38, USB, wi-fi optional extra). The devices, which at one point were distributed through US vendors such as Walmart, Newegg and Amazon, were normally sold unlocked and unconfigured. The user was able to configure logins for multiple, simultaneous providers.

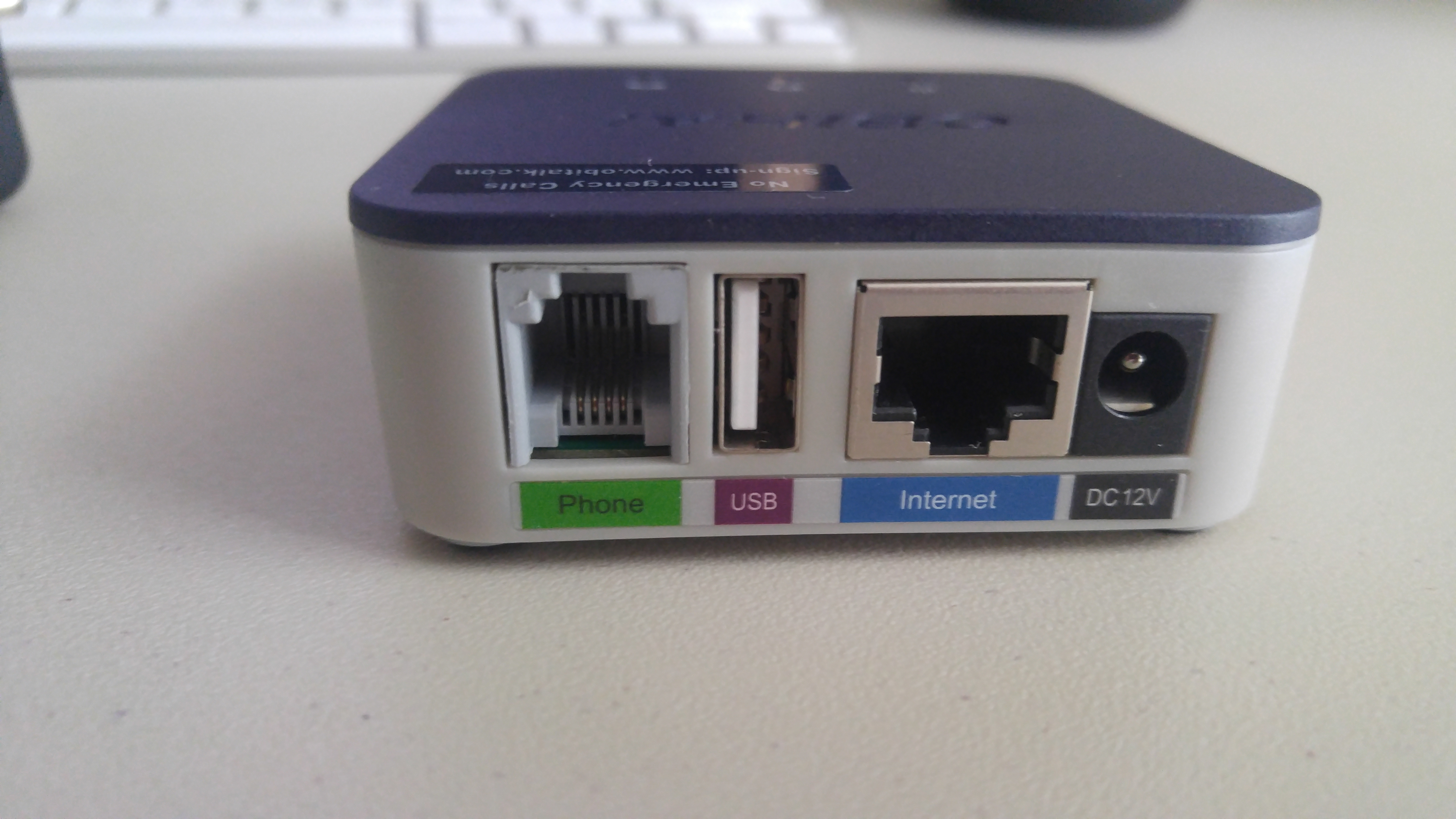
The Obi200 produced by Obihai Technologies and branded by Google Voice. Back I/O panel.

Obihai operated its own preconfigured OBiTALK VoIP service to allow direct calling between its branded devices (using **9 and a nine-digit serial number), as well as a companion OBiON softphone app for Android and iPhone.

There was also a Service Provider Template for various individual providers (such as Anveo and Phone Power); earlier devices used an online wizard to automate the configuration process.

Google Voice support, a popular feature due to the low cost of service, was temporarily broken when that service dropped XMPP support in May 2014 and officially restored in September 2014. It was again broken at the end of 2017 for OBi100/110 devices due to update of Google certificates, and previous end of support for Obi100/Obi100 in 2016. Later old certificates were temporarily restored by Google and service stopped again in May 2018. At the same time a community found a way to put a correct new Google certificates into Obi100/110 even without vendor support and anonymously described it in www.obifirmware.com.

The 2021 discontinuation of the Obahai 200-series analogue telephone adapters left no hardware devices from any source able to connect to the consumer Google Voice service. Google has no plans to make this capability available in the future.

== See also ==
- Cisco Systems and Linksys
- Sipura Technology
- Grandstream
- Google Voice
