= Sinch AB =

Telecommunications and cloud communications platform as a service (PaaS) company

- Formerly: CLX Communications
- Type: Public
- Traded as: XSTO: SINCH
- Industry: Cloud communications
- Headquarters: Stockholm, Sweden
- Website: sinch.com

Sinch AB, formerly CLX Communications, is a communications platform as a service (CPaaS) company which powers messaging, voice, and email communications between businesses and their customers. Headquartered in Stockholm, Sweden, the company employs over 4000 people in more than 60 countries.

== History ==
=== CLX Communications ===
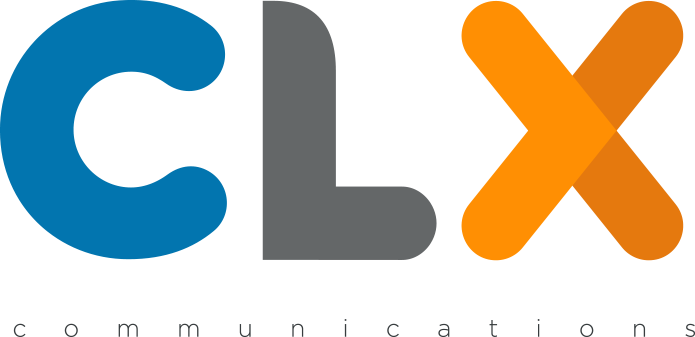
CLX Communications logo

CLX Communications, better known as CLX, was founded in 2008 by Johan Hedberg, Robert Gerstmann, Kristian Männik, Henrik Sandell, Björn Zethraeus and Kjell Arvidsson, as a telecommunications and cloud communications platform as a service (PaaS) company. CLX acquired numerous companies in the industry between 2009 and 2018 and then later under the brand name Sinch from 2019.

In 2014, CLX acquired Voltari's mobile messaging business in the US and Canada.

After announcing its intention to proceed with an initial public offering (IPO) in September 2015, CLX completed the IPO of its shares and began trading on Nasdaq Stockholm in October 2015, with the introduction price set at SEK 59. The company is listed on Nasdaq Stockholm, on the Mid Cap list under the Technology sector.

In 2016 CLX acquired Mblox for US$117 million. At the time, Mblox was one of the largest messaging service providers in the world, delivering 7 billion messages in 2015.

In 2017, CLX acquired German provider Xura Secure Communications GmbH in February 2017, and UK-based Dialogue in May 2017.

Also in 2017, CLX entered into a strategic partnership with Google "to provide the next generation of messaging services to brand marketers using Rich Communications Services (RCS) standard embedded directly into consumers' native messaging apps". Part of Google's Early Access Program (EAP), CLX enabled enterprises to build with RCS and was one of the first companies to offer an upgraded messaging experience.

In March 2018, CLX entered into a definitive agreement to acquire Danish company Unwire Communication ApS for DKK 148 million. Upon completion, CLX became the largest CPaaS provider in the Nordic region. The following month, they announced that they had acquired Seattle-based company Vehicle for US$8 million.

=== Symsoft ===
Symsoft logo

Symsoft was founded in Stockholm in 1989, to supply charging and messaging services to mobile operators. The company was initially founded as a consultancy company but shifted focus in the late 1990s to sell products. Formerly listed on Nasdaq Stockholm, it provided mobile communications in the areas of Real-Time BSS, SMS and other messaging services, with SS7 security for mobile network operators (MNOs), mobile virtual network operators (MVNOs) and mobile virtual network enablers (MVNEs).

The first deployment of the Symsoft SMS real-time charging was with TeliaMobile, now Telia Company, in Sweden in 1999. Building on the Telia case and other early projects relating to mobile messaging and real-time charging Symsoft launched the Symsoft Service Delivery Platform (formerly known as the Nobill platform).

In 2009, CLX acquired Symsoft, which then formed the Operator Division of CLX Communications. The division offered software and services to customers in the areas of IoT platforms, real-time BSS, VAS, fraud prevention solutions for revenue retention and full-service solutions for virtual operators.

As of 2016, Symsoft had experience in upgrading and replacing legacy systems in the areas of BSS, Value Added Services and Security. The company serves mobile operators, MVNOs and MVNEs such as America Móvil, Virgin Mobile, Polkomtel, Saudi Telecom, Simfonics Telefónica, Telia Company, Unify Mobile and 3 in 30+ countries.

=== Mblox ===
Mblox logo

Mblox Inc. was a global company, architected by William "Chip" Hoffman, that provided a Carrier-grade, global mobile messaging platform to enterprises, including global one-way and two-way SMS, MMS, push notifications, ring-tones, shortcodes and virtual mobile numbers. Mblox Ltd. was founded in 1999, by Andrew Bud in London, England. In 2002, MBlox, Ltd. was acquired by a newly restructured and capitalized Mobilesys, Inc. Founded by David Coelho, the company assumed the name MBlox, Inc. at Andrew Bud's insistence and operated dual headquarters in Sunnyvale, California, and London, England. This transaction was spearheaded by Q-Advisors, a boutique investment bank founded by Michael Quinn in 2001 and located in Denver, Colorado. The CEO of mBlox, Inc. was William "Chip" Hoffman, who architected and executed the transaction with the help of Gary Cuccio (Chairman), and Jay Emmet (COO). The new company - Mblox Inc. – became the world leader in SMS technology use and carrier clearing and billing, growing from $1.75 million in 2002 to over $2 billion in pro forma revenue by April 2004 (19 months). This growth was primarily organic with geographic expansion into over 30 countries, including London, San Francisco, Atlanta, Stockholm, Paris, Munich, Madrid, Singapore, Manila, and Sydney.

In 2003, the company acquired carrier-grade message delivery capabilities through the purchase of an SMSC from Comverse. After stepping down in mid-2004, William "Chip" Hoffman handed the reins to then-Chairman Gary Cuccio, former Senior Executive with Pacific Telesis, and COO of the wildly successful Omnipoint Wireless. Cuccio added the CEO role to his chairmanship.

From 2005 to 2006, the company opened offices in Singapore and Australia. The year 2009 was marked by the opening of the Milan office, Italy.

- 2010: Acquired Mashmobile (Sweden)
- 2011: Added direct Latin America two-way messaging services
- 2012: Added push and rich-push messaging capability
- 2013: Opened offices in Brazil and South Africa
- 2014: Acquired Zoove and CardBoardFish; increasing reach and product offerings
- 2015: Mblox acquired 4INFO SMS Services
- 2016: Sold Zoove
- 2016: Mblox was acquired by CLX Communications AB (Publ)

In December 2017, the parent company CLX Communications retired the Mblox and CardBoardFish brands.

==== Public criticism and fines ====
Starting in 2006, with the release of the globally successful "Crazy Frog" ring-tone, MBlox became a target for regulators. Since phone bills from some carriers attribute charges to the company doing the billing, rather than to the business that actually sold and provided the service, Mblox had been accused in Internet forums of enabling a process called cramming, or automatically signing mobile customers up for unsolicited services and billing them accordingly. As of 2008, the company had been fined 22 times for cramming-related offences, totaling hundreds of thousands of dollars. Since Mblox had never had any involvement, direct or indirect, in creating or promoting such services, its responsibility was to try to prevent its customers abusing the SMS-based billing services it provided them. Following the sudden spate of problems in 2008–09, in 2010 the UK regulator Phonepay Plus commended Mblox for "a significant investment in new technology, personnel and resources to aid compliance and prevent further harm occurring to consumers from services operating over its platform." In the UK, Mblox had not been cited in any case since December 2011, at which time the regulator described its actions as "exemplary". On March 19, 2013, Mblox sold its PSMS business to OpenMarket as it chose to focus exclusively on Enterprise to Consumer mobile messaging. This brought an end to its involvement in mobile payments

=== Sinch ===
Sinch was initially founded in May 2014 by Andreas Bernström in Stockholm and San Francisco. Originally the technology behind Rebtel, Sinch was spun-out with $12 million in funding, focusing on the mobile first, app developer market. Sinch launched its Voice and Instant Messaging products in May 2014, and quickly launched their SMS API product at the end of 2014.

In 2016, CLX also acquired Sinch for a total consideration of SEK 138.9 million on a debt-free basis.

=== Brand Unification ===
In February 2019, it was announced that CLX had "launched a new corporate brand and visual identity" to unify all its business units under the same name. After acquiring Sinch in 2016, they have now leveraged the brand name to encompass the entire company to "more accurately and immediately [depict] its current offerings and mission".

Sinch effectively has inherited the history of CLX Communications and is considered a different brand to the one launched in 2014.

CLX completed an initial public offering (IPO) and were listed on Nasdaq Stockholm in October 2015. Since February 2019, the company can be found on the Mid Cap list under the Technology sector under the ticker 'SINCH'.

In September 2019, Sinch acquired myElefant, a Software-as-a-Service platform for rich interactive messaging, for an upfront cash consideration of EUR 18.5 million, with an additional cash earnout of up to three million within two years if certain gross profit targets were met.

In October 2019, Sinch acquired TWW do Brasil S.A., one of the largest SMS connectivity providers in Brazil, for an enterprise value of BRL 180,750 million.

In March 2020, Sinch acquired Brazilian messaging provider Wavy for a total cash consideration of BRL 355 million and 1,534,582 new shares in Sinch. This corresponded to an enterprise value of SEK 1,187 million.

In May 2020, Sinch acquired SAP Digital Interconnect (SDI) — a unit within SAP offering services in programmable communications, carrier messaging, and enterprise solutions — for a total cash consideration of EUR 225 million.

In June, 2020, Sinch acquired ACL Mobile Ltd (ACL), a vendor of communications services in India and Southeast Asia, for a total consideration of INR 5,350 million (approximately SEK 655 million).

In February 2021, Sinch acquired Inteliquent, an interconnection provider for voice communications, for $1.14 billion.

In June 2021, Sinch acquired MessageMedia for a total enterprise value of US$1.3 billion, with a total cash consideration of US$1.1 billion and 1,128,487 new shares in Sinch. MessageMedia provides mobile messaging solutions for small and medium-sized businesses in the United States and Australia, New Zealand, and Europe.

In September 2021, Sinch entered into a definitive agreement to acquire MessengerPeople (now Sinch Engage), a SaaS-based conversational messaging platform, for a total enterprise value of EUR 48 million, with a total cash consideration of EUR 33.6 million and EUR 14.4 million paid in the form of new shares in Sinch.

In September 2021, Sinch acquired cloud-based email delivery platform Pathwire (now Sinch Mailgun, Sinch Mailjet, and Sinch Email on Acid) for a cash consideration of US$925 million and 51 million new shares in Sinch, which corresponds to an enterprise value of approximately US$1.9 billion.

== Competitors ==
Sinch's main competitors are Twilio, Infobip, and Vonage.

== Controversy ==
In May 2022, the Federal Trade Commission (FTC) of the United States of America sent a cease-and-desist letter to the Inteliquent division of Sinch for hosting illegal robocall campaigns. In the cease-and-desist letter, the FTC cited robocalls from Social Security Administration imposters, AT&T/DirecTV imposters, Utility disconnection/rebate/rate reduction scams, Auto warranty robocalls, and Credit card interest rate reduction robocalls.

== Awards ==
CEO and Founder Andreas was announced as one of The 9 Most Innovative People in VoIP in 2014.

== See also ==
- Cloud communications
- GSMA
- Short Messaging Service
- Telecommunication
