= Komodo Technology =

American voice over IP company

- Type: Subsidiary
- Industry: computer networking
- Fate: merged to Linksys
- Headquarters: United States
- Products: ATAs and networking
- Parent: Cisco Systems

Komodo Technology is an American voice over IP company. It was founded in 1999 in Los Gatos, California, and acquired by Cisco Systems on July 25, 2000, for US$175 million in stock. It was a leading company in internet and enterprise telephone technology products, notable primarily for its introduction of the analog telephone adapter for voice over IP in the 1990s.

Komodo Technology developed VoIP telephony products and other media appliances for various telephony markets.

== See also ==
- Sipura Technology
- Obihai Technology
