= Google Voice =

Telecommunications service by Google

- Google Voice running on a browser, Android, and iOS
- Developer: Google LLC
- Release: March 11, 2009; 17 years ago

Stable release(s) [±]
- Android: 2026.6.13 (Build 931862792) / June 17, 2026; 4 months ago
- iOS (Note: Including iPadOS): 26.24 / June 18, 2026; 4 months ago
- Google Chrome, discontinued: 3.0.11 / December 19, 2024; 22 months ago
- Operating system: Android 8+; iOS 18+; Web
- Website: voice.google.com

Google Voice is a telephone service that provides a U.S. telephone number to Google Account customers in the U.S. and Google Workspace (G Suite by October 2020) customers in Canada, Denmark, France, the Netherlands, Portugal, Spain, Sweden, Switzerland, the United Kingdom and the contiguous United States. The service is configured and maintained by users in a web-based application, similar in style to Google's email service Gmail, or Android and iOS applications on smartphones or tablets. It is used for call forwarding and voicemail services, voice and text messaging, as well as U.S. and Canadian domestic and international calls. Incoming calls are forwarded to one or more telephone numbers that users must configure and verify in the account.

Users can answer and receive calls on any of the telephones or applications configured to ring. While answering a call, the user can switch between the configured devices. Subscribers in the United States can make outgoing calls to domestic and international destinations.

Google Voice currently provides free PC-to-phone calling within the United States and Canada, and PC-to-PC voice and video calling worldwide between users of the Google+ Hangouts browser plugin (available for Windows, Intel-based Mac OS X, and Linux). Almost all domestic and outbound calls to the United States (including Alaska and Hawaii) and Canada are currently free from the U.S. and Canada, and $0.01 per minute from everywhere else. International calls are billed according to a schedule posted on the Google Voice website.

Many other Google Voice services—such as voicemail, free text messaging, call history, call screening, blocking of unwanted calls, and voice transcription to text of voicemail messages—are also available to U.S. residents. Voicemails, missed call notifications, and/or text messages can optionally be forwarded to an email account of the user's choice. Additionally, text messages can be sent and received via the familiar email or IM interface by reading and writing text messages in numbers in Google Talk respectively (PC-to-Phone texting).

== Overview ==
Google provides free PC-to-PC voice calling worldwide. As described above, Google Voice users in many countries may make low-cost calls to international telephone numbers, and currently may also make free PC-to-phone calls within the United States and Canada. Vincent Paquet, a co-founder of GrandCentral who became a senior product manager at Google after the company had acquired the service in 2009, said that he expected Google Voice domestic service to remain free because the cost of operation is so low and, "We can generate enough revenue from international calling to support the service." As of 2021, the service remains free of charge to use in the U.S., while international calls require paid credits.

A Google Voice local telephone number for incoming calls is currently available only for users in the United States. Users may select a single U.S. telephone number from various area codes, free of charge to each account. Incoming calls to the number may ring simultaneously any of the user's configured phones or the account's Google Talk feature. Based on the calling number, or contact group (e.g., Family, Friends, Work), or on time of day (e.g., disabling a home telephone during business hours and routing calls to mobile or business number), individual numbers may be configured to ring. Multiple destinations may be specified that ring simultaneously for incoming calls. Service setup/initiation requires a non-VOIP USA telephone number for verification and identification purposes. Calls may be initiated from any of the configured telephones, as well as from a mobile device app, or from the account portal. As of August 2011, users in many other countries also may place outbound calls from the web-based application to domestic and international telephone numbers.

The service also features voicemail with indexable automated voicemail transcription, accessible via a web browser, e-mail, or by phone. Google Voice provides automatic blocking of known numbers, e.g., telemarketers, the ability to switch lines in mid-call, differentiated voice mail greetings based on caller, and call recording. In 2021, Google discontinued Short Message Service (SMS) forwarding.

Previously, customers of Gizmo5, a Session Initiation Protocol (SIP) service vendor acquired by Google, were allowed to forward calls to their Gizmo service which may be answered using a free computer application, or a web application, or SIP-based telephone hardware. Google discontinued Gizmo5 service on April 3, 2011.

Several competing virtual number services, such as eVoice. Personal numbering services have been available in the United Kingdom since 1993, similar to the AT&T True Connections 500 service offered in the 1990s in the United States. AT&T's service required the direct involvement of AT&T to change the telephone number list, while the Google service is user-configurable on the web application.

The original voice of GrandCentral and Google Voice belonged to actress and voice-over artist Laurie Burke, but has been replaced with recordings by Kiki Baessell, a Googler who had no experience in professional voice-overs, but was chosen because of her pleasant, familiar voice.

As of late 2009, Google Voice had approximately 1.4 million users, of which 570,000 used the service 7 days a week. This number rose markedly after Google transitioned Google Voice from being "invitation only" to being available to all Gmail subscribers in the United States.

Google Voice is a telecommunications service offered by Google that gives its users a telephone number that they can use to place and receive telephone calls, send text messages, and receive voicemail. The service can be accessed via web browsers and mobile devices, and offers features such as call forwarding, voicemail transcription, spam protection, call screening, and number porting.

Google Voice also provides businesses and organisations with a cloud phone system, known as Google Voice for Business. Call routing, ring groups, auto attendants, voicemail transcription, call recording and integration with Google services like Gmail, Google Calendar, and Google Meet are all part of the business features.

Google's foray into the voice services space dates back over 15 years to the USA, when it launched Voice as a call-forwarding and texting service. In 2026, Google launched an AI-driven function for note-taking of Voice calls with Gemini, enabling users to automatically take notes during voice calls.

== History ==
=== Origin ===
GrandCentral, founded in 2005 by Craig Walker and Vincent Paquet with funding by Minor Ventures, was acquired by Google on July 2, 2007, for US$95 million in a transaction led by Wesley Chan. Although GrandCentral users were able to continue to use the service after the purchase, new users were not accepted, and Google made no public statements about their plans for the service. On March 11, 2009, the management of the service revealed that the team had been working on it throughout that period, apparently in secret, and that it was being rebranded "Google Voice". It was to keep most of the functionality originally offered in GrandCentral and add new features. Google hired a telecom design consultant, Peter Bouchard; he was brought on to make modifications and help relaunch the service. The service was launched by Google on March 11, 2009. A Wired blog post quoted a figure of 3.5 million users in 2013.

=== Google transition ===
Google Voice was launched on March 11, 2009, based on GrandCentral, with new features, including voicemail transcriptions and SMS managing. However, GrandCentral's Ringback Tone feature was not transitioned over to Google Voice. Google transitioned former GrandCentral accounts to Google Voice and announced that the service would start accepting new members "within weeks" of the announcement. On June 25, 2009, NBC's Today Show stated that Google Voice would be available nationwide on that day. Google confirmed this in a Twitter message stating: "Google Voice on NBC Today Show. Invites to people on reservations list starting to go out today." The expansion was at first limited to users queued on the invitation list. Users with paid-in balances also received a limited number of invitation opportunities.

On July 1, 2009, Google Voice provided the option for users to change their service telephone number for a U.S. $10 fee.

On September 15, 2009, GrandCentral calling services were discontinued. Subscribers who used the website could still log into the site to retrieve old messages and data. After termination of GrandCentral services, users who haven't moved over to Google Voice were still advised to upgrade their account to Google Voice.

=== Gizmo5 acquisition ===
On November 12, 2009, Google announced that it had acquired Gizmo5 for a reported U.S. $30 million in cash. A major effect of this announcement was that Gizmo5 suspended new signups pending re-launch by Google. Google was reported to be working on a desktop application, though rumors also circulated that the project had been scrapped in favor of a browser-based solution. On August 26, 2010 Gmail accounts with Google Voice were given a function to make and receive calls. Google Voice product manager, Vincent Paquet, confirmed that this function was added through the help of the technology received after the Gizmo5 acquisition. In 2011, the Gizmo5 site closed service to its registered members. As of January 2012, the website is no longer available.

=== Open availability ===
On June 22, 2010, Google Voice removed its invitation requirement, making the service accessible to all U.S. users with a Google account.

=== Rejection from the iPhone app store ===
On July 27, 2009, Apple Inc. rejected a Google Voice app that had been submitted by Google six weeks earlier. Other apps created for use with Google Voice, such as GVdialer, GV Mobile and VoiceCentral, were removed from the App Store. Apple states that the reason for the rejection and removals is that these apps replaced certain iPhone functions and features.

A Google spokesman released this statement on the matter:

We work hard to bring Google applications to a number of mobile platforms, including the iPhone. Apple Inc. did not approve the Google Voice application we submitted six weeks ago to the App Store (iOS/iPadOS). We will continue to work to bring our services to iPhone users – for example, by taking advantage of advances in mobile browsers.

The Federal Communications Commission (FCC) opened an inquiry regarding the rejection of Google Voice for the iPhone. "The FCC asked why Apple rejected the Google Voice application for the iPhone and removed related 'third-party applications' from its store." The FCC has also requested Google to submit a letter describing the application of Google Voice. "The request is part of a broader-ranging inquiry by the commission on exclusive deals between cell phone carriers and handset manufacturers for hot phones."

In their response to the FCC, Google stated that the Google Voice application uses the carrier's voice network to place telephone calls, dispelling misconceptions that it is a Voice over Internet Protocol application. AT&T stated that they had no role in approval or rejection of the Google Voice application. Apple stated that they had not rejected the application but were continuing to examine it. One argument against allowing the Google Voice app on the iPhone is that they are concerned that it replaces the iPhone user interface with its own; however many other dialers and messaging apps are available from the app store.

As a result of rejection from the Apple Store, Google released its Google Voice iPhone application as a web app in January 2010, and certain apps like GV Mobile are available through Cydia on jailbroken iPhones.

In September 2010, Sean Kovacs, creator of the app GV Mobile +, announced on his Twitter that Apple had re-accepted the application, and it has since been available for purchase on the Apple App Store. This is the second Google Voice service app available in the Apple's official application store for a year and a half, released just a day after "GV Connect" had been available.

In November 2010, the official Google Voice iPhone application became available in the App Store in the United States, but was still not available in other countries.

=== Google Hangouts ===
In September 2014, certain Google Voice features were integrated into the Google Hangouts application, an instant messaging client, which is a replacement for Google Talk. In early 2021, Google removed Google Voice support from the Hangouts mobile and desktop apps.

=== 2017 update ===
In January 2017, Google made the first significant updates to Google Voice in approximately five years for Android, iOS, and the Web. The user interface was overhauled with Material Design. Group and photo MMS became natively supported in Voice, not depending on Hangouts integration. Voicemail transcription for Spanish was introduced, and Google promised to provide new updates and features.

=== Google Workspace ===
On July 25, 2018, Google announced the launch of a beta version of Google Voice for business customers at their Cloud NEXT event in San Francisco, California. On April 10, 2019, Google announced the general availability release for Google Voice for existing G Suite (now Google Workspace) customers in select countries.

== Features ==
Features of Google Voice, many retained from GrandCentral, include:

- Calling international telephone numbers with rates starting at US$0.01 per minute
- Ability to change your number for a fee
- Ability to port your mobile number for a fee
- Specifying an existing telephone number instead of the Google Voice number on initial setup for use with limited functionality, such as some voicemail functions and using the voice mail system for the user's telephone number (mobile devices only).

While many customers in countries beside the United States have been grandfathered into Google Voice services, the features are reduced and customers are often charged for calls to their own countries. Currently Google Voice PC-to-phone calling works only for calls into the United States and Canada or for domestic or international calls from the United States and Canada; Google plans to implement this for other countries, but a time frame has not been released. A U.S. telephone number is required to obtain a Google Voice telephone number for redirecting incoming calls.

=== Caller ID ===
Google Voice uses the caller's Google Voice number as the CLID on outgoing calls when the user places a call by calling the user's own Google Voice number and using the service's menu choices, or when the web-based account portal is used to place a call.

=== Mobile phone applications ===
Example of (old) Google Voice inbox running on Android Jelly Bean

Google Voice applications for Android and iOS can automatically place outgoing calls and texts via the user's Google Voice service.

Google Voice does not support SMS to telephone numbers outside of the United States. As of 1 June 2010 Google had purposely blocked international texts, with the intention of reintroducing the service once billing systems are in place.

=== Integration into Gmail and Google Talk ===
When Google Voice was offered during beta testing, Gmail Labs offered an add-on so users could listen to voicemail messages in their Gmail inbox. Since August 26, 2010, U.S. Gmail users may place calls to the U.S., Canada, and international destinations from within Gmail. Calls to U.S. and Canadian telephone numbers are free, while the cost of calls to international destinations starts at 1 cents per minute. This is possible with the help of a voice and video chat plugin for web browsers to connect to cameras, microphones, and speakers installed in the computer.

== Technical Operations ==
Google Voice operates as a Voice over IP (VoIP) service that integrates internet-based calling with the public switched telephone network (PSTN). Users are assigned a US telephone number and calls are routed through Google's cloud infrastructure. For VoIP calls via the Google Voice app or web client, it employs WebRTC for real-time audio transport over UDP ports 19302–19309, using the Opus codec for high-definition audio when both endpoints are using VoIP. Calls involving the PSTN are bridged via session border controllers (SBCs) using the Session Initiation Protocol (SIP) to connect to telecom partners listed under § Partners and Infrastructure, falling back to the G.711 codec. Outbound carrier-mode calls dial a Google access number, connecting to Google's servers before routing the call to the destination, with the user's Google Voice number as the caller ID. Incoming calls are received by partner carriers, handed to Google's SBCs, and simultaneously ring all configured devices.

Google Voice launched in 2009 as a PSTN relay service and became a full VoIP service in 2018 with WebRTC, replacing XMPP signaling used with Google Talk and OBihai using analog telephone adapters. A 2024 patent lawsuit highlighted a split-channel approach for pre-call data and voice efficiency.

== Limitations ==
=== No emergency calling ===
Google Voice refers to itself as an "enhanced call management application" and as such "is not capable of placing or receiving emergency services calls." Attempting to dial 911 in the U.S. indicates that the number is not valid.

=== Limited international texting service ===
Google Voice supports sending text messages to telephone numbers in the U.S. and Canada, but users can receive text messages from anywhere in the world.

=== VoIP services ===
Google Voice permits Voice Over IP (VoIP) as a beta from both the web and Android clients. It formerly supported XMPP signaling but no longer does. However, it has been reported that at one time some users could receive calls with their Google Voice accounts via the Session Initiation Protocol (SIP).

=== Third-party devices ===
Hardware manufacturers such as Obihai Technology have created devices that enable the home user to use conventional wired telephone(s) to place and receive calls over their broadband connection through Google Voice, as well as other service providers.

Google Voice terminated support for some XMPP services in May 2014, disrupting service for 3rd party apps. Affected vendors included Talkatone, GrooveIP and Obihai. Obihai initially recommended its users to switch to rival providers but returned with official Google Voice support for its hardware analog telephone adapters on September 11, 2014.

Software manufacturers offer applications, such as PCPhoneSoft.com's "GVJack" App that converts magicJack dongles to use Google Voice. The GVJackApp for magicJack and the GVMate Phone Adapter are signalling independent and continued to work (using Google Hangouts) after support for XMPP was terminated.

=== Call forwarding and voicemail ===
If the telephone to which a call is forwarded does not connect within 25 seconds, then calls are routed to Google Voice's voicemail. Users who want calls to be picked up by their home, work, or mobile telephone voicemail systems or answering machines must turn off call screening in Google Voice and make sure that their phone's voicemail systems or answering machines pick up within 25 seconds.

== Partners and infrastructure ==
Google Voice's partners that provide telephone numbers, call-termination, call-routing, and other infrastructure include:

- Bandwidth.com
- Broadvox Communications
- Global Crossing {Lumen)
- IBasis for international outbound call routing
- Level 3 Communications (Lumen)
- Neustar
- Pac-West Telecom

In 2009, Google reserved 1 million telephone numbers with Level 3 Communications which were presumed to be for Google Voice.

== Dispute between AT&T and Google about call blocking ==
AT&T petitioned the U.S. Federal Communications Commission (FCC) to require Google (as it requires POTS providers) to allow calls to high-cost destinations, typically rural independent telephone companies with wholesale prices up to ten times above the national average. Google responded that it is not obligated to allow these calls.

== Exploitation ==
Google Voice requires an existing carrier telephone number and a generated PIN to register. However, many users simply employ one of numerous text verification websites to supply temporary "real" numbers.

Scammers wanting multiple anonymous unauthorized Google Voice numbers have tricked strangers into registering Google Voice numbers to their personal telephone numbers.

== See also ==
- Bandwidth.com
- Burner (mobile application)
- Caller ID spoofing
- Comparison of VoIP software
- Google Fi Wireless
- Level 3 Communications
- PrivatePhone
- Public switched telephone network
- Traffic pumping
- Google Meet
