= GoIP =

GoIP is a GSM-gateway[1] and SIM bank produced by the Hybertone and DBL technology companies. It enables connections between the GSM network and VoIP.

== Usage concept ==
Sim-card is put into GSM-gateways (or SIM-bank connected to GSM-gateway) in order to register it with the GSM network, at the same time the gateway is associated with VoIP through program switch. Accordingly, the traffic can be converted in and out between GSM and VoIP channels. SIP and H.323 protocols are used for media traffic termination. GoIP equipment is compatible with all main IP PBX: Asterisk, Mera, Oktell, 3CX, etc.

Compared with PSTN, GSM-gateways provide a drastic economy by amending the infrastructure and lowering the expenditures on technical support.

GoIP includes integral support of SIP and H.323 protocols with flexible settings. Duplex authentification of password and trust-list backup will significantly decrease telecommunication expenditures while maintaining an adaptable system of call transfer. The GoIP gateway supports several devices' groups, with flexible settings of large GSM-gateways groups with different channels.

=== There are several models of GoIP GSM gateways ===
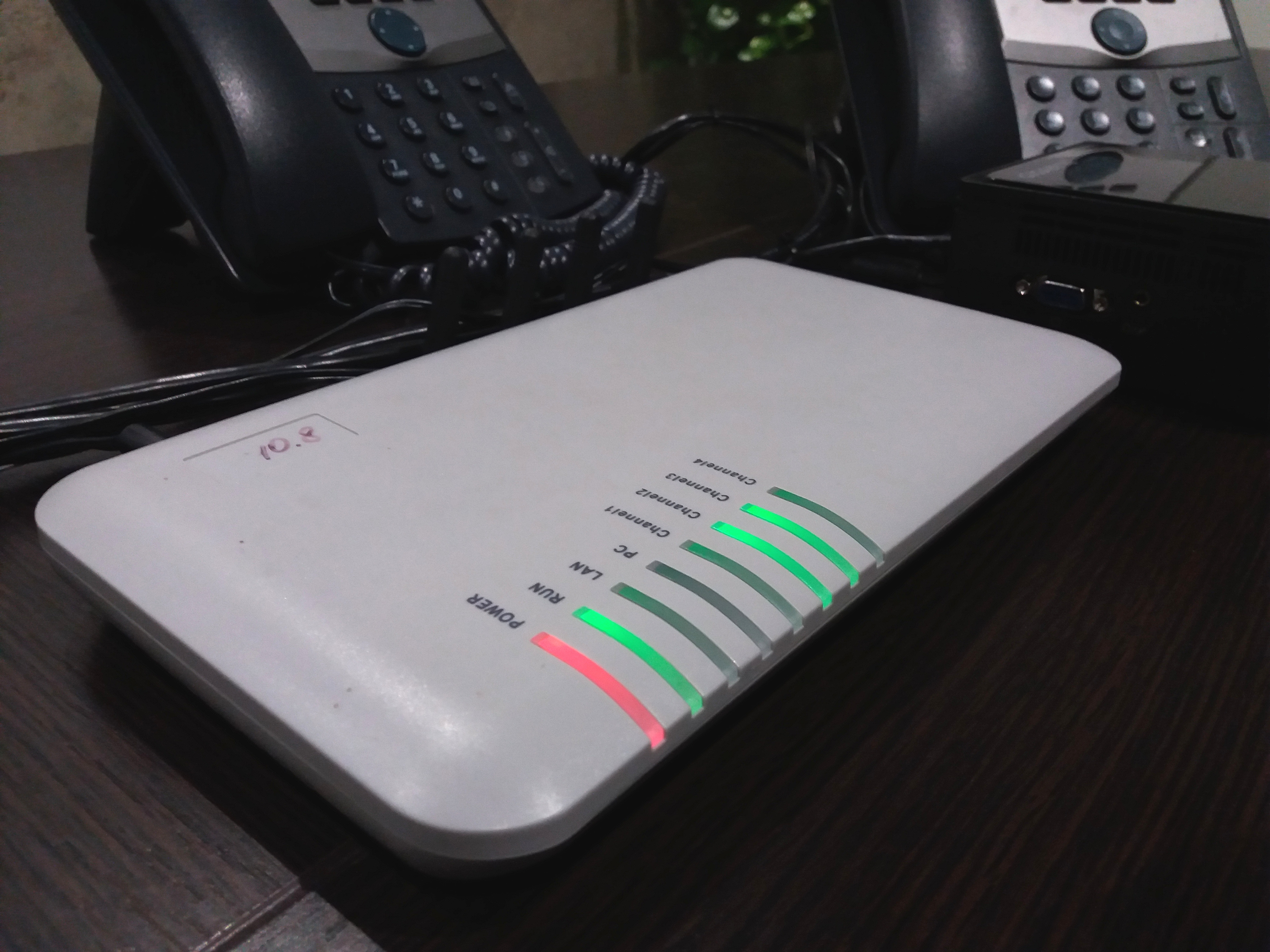
Goip-4

- 1 Port GSM VoIP Gateway,
- 4 Port GSM VoIP Gateway,
- 8 Port GSM VoIP Gateway,
- 16 Port GSM VoIP Gateway,
- 32-Port GSM VoIP Gateway.
- 64 Ports GSM VoIP Gateway,

Applications of GoIP gateways: They are vastly usable by system integrators, TCP, call centers, large and little companies, and domestic users of VoIP as well.

VoIP-GSM gateways produced on the GoIP platform help to accomplish the following:

Adding the mobile lines in the existing telephone system (GoIP provides a GSM network between telephone systems and IP PBX, and ensures a fast connection to PSTN where usual telephone lines are unavailable) Organization of outbound call-centers Call transfer from GSM into SIP and backward (inbound and outbound calls between GSM and VoIP)

=== Determination of SIM-bank ===
SIM-bank is a SIM-card controller that provides remote control over VoIP GSM gateways and allows to simplify and automatize many procedures likewise:

- fast connection of SIM cards to the gateway, rapid exchange of SIM-cards via the Internet, and their prearranged synchronous replacement.

The cooperative use of GoIP gateways and GoIP SIM-bank enables the management of unmanned devices and reduces the work pressure in SIM-cards operations, for example, SIM-cards replacement and replenishment.

=== The remote access advantages for SIM cards ===
Centr their dynamic allocation, no need to change or reinsert the SIM card in the device, rapid replacement of SIM cards with no breakdowns in service.

For instance, the remote GoIP gateway will no longer require the replacement of SIM cards in the device or their reinsertion. One can manage the group of GoIP gateways remotely, effectively, and with the minimal loss with the help of a SIM bank. The main advantages of SIM-bank appliances include 1) the replacement of SIM cards in gateways channels that are territorially remote from the very SIM bank and other gateways in order to transfer the SIM cards between the base stations of GSM operator and 2) autonomous work that supports from 32 to 128 channels for SIM-cards independent connections.

Sources:

- GoIP Series GSM VoIP Gateway User Manual
- GoIP Configuration Guide
- GoIP User Manual
