= White, black and grey routes =

In telecommunications business, a white route is a route where both source and destination are legal termination. This is opposed to a black route, which is a route that is illegal in both ends. Also common in telecom (especially VoIP) is the term grey route, which defines a route that is legal for one country or the party on one end, but illegal on the alternative end.

An example of the white/grey/black trichotomy is often seen in telecom routes from the United States to India. In India, a telecom oligopoly is granted to a few large corporations. Hence, all legal ("white") telecom traffic to the country is subject to the rates imposed by these corporations. To overcome this restriction for the purpose of achieving lower costs for consumers, and to make a profit in the process, many small parties set up VoIP routers in homes and offices around India. Telecom traffic from other countries is sent to these VoIP routers via IP and terminated to the local Indian PSTN. This process is illegal in India ("black"), but completely lawful in the USA ("white"). A route like this, white on one end and black on the other is said to be "grey".

== SIM boxes ==
A "SIM box" is an unofficial voice over IP gateway which uses multiple mobile telephones and SIM cards for PSTN connectivity, while connecting to the Internet by conventional means. These are normally operated clandestinely in third-world calling destinations as the "black" end of a "grey route" where conventional private branch exchange lines (such as T-carrier primary rate interface) are not available to VoIP operators due to a hostile local regulatory environment.

In India, for instance, an Internet Service Licensee is not permitted to have PSTN/PLMN connectivity as voice communication to and from a telephone connected to PSTN/PLMN and following E.164 numbering is prohibited in India. By using licensing restrictions and regulations to ensure that the interconnection between the PSTN/PLMN network and Internet is not permitted, the government in India delivers a lucrative monopoly to International Long Distance (ILD) service providers licensed under Section 4 of the Indian Telegraph Act as the only carriers officially allowed to carry international long-distance traffic into India.

== See also ==
- Voice over IP
- Rent seeking
