= Internet telephony service provider =

An Internet telephony service provider (ITSP) offers digital telecommunications services based on Voice over Internet Protocol (VoIP) that are provisioned via the Internet.

ITSPs provide services to end-users directly or as whole-sale suppliers to other ITSPs.

ITSPs use a variety of signaling and multimedia protocols, including the Session Initiation Protocol (SIP), the Media Gateway Control Protocol (MGCP), Megaco, and the H.323 protocol. H.323 is one of the earliest VoIP protocols, but its use is declining and it is rarely used for consumer products.

Retail customers of an ITSP may use traditional analog telephone sets attached to an analog telephony adapter (ATA) to connect to the service provider's network via a local area network, they may use an IP phone, or they may connect a private branch exchange (PBX) system to the service via media gateways.

ITSPs are also known as voice service providers (VSP).

== History ==
Usually, ITSPs negotiate agreements for route termination to various parts of the world from multiple VoIP providers. ITSP customers may be able to choose a VoIP provider for their VoIP calls. Customers may be able to do this by specifying the maximum price they are willing to pay per minute for a call and the lowest quality they are willing to tolerate. The ITSP routing software searches for the wholesale VoIP providers who meet the customer specification and attempt to route the customer call to the providers starting with the one have the lowest quoted price. Pricing to different parts of the world depend on several factors, such as the routing via a white route or a black route, wholesaler's margin, and the country's regulations.

== See also ==
- List of VoIP companies
- SIP trunking
- Telecommunications service provider
- VoIP
