= Inteliquent =

American communications company

- Type: Private
- Industry: Telecommunications
- Founded: 1997
- Headquarters: Chicago, Illinois, USA
- Key people: Ed O'Hara (CEO); Surendra Saboo (President)
- Products: Voice, Messaging
- Website: inteliquent.com

Inteliquent is a communications enabler offering network-based voice and messaging services to Wireless, cable, carriers and communication service providers. Inteliquent's services include voice, toll-free, messaging, and emergency communication. Inteliquent was acquired by Sinch in 2021.

== History ==
In 2003, Inteliquent created the first independent tandem network, a "network of networks" uniquely interconnecting disparate carrier networks to facilitate the exchange of traffic.

This network simplified the routing of local transit traffic among Wireless, cable, CLEC, and broadband telephony companies, serving as a basis for subsequent interconnection services.

- 2007 - Neutral Tandem's first public offering on the NASDAQ exchange under the symbol IQNT.
- 2007 - Zayo acquired Onvoy, Inc.
- 2010 - Named no. 2 on Crain's Fast 50 (fastest-growing companies by five-year revenue growth).
- 2010 - Completed acquisition of Tinet SpA, an Italian-based global carrier in the IP Transit and Ethernet wholesale market.
- 2017 - GTCR acquired Inteliquent and merged it with Onvoy moving forward as "Inteliquent".
- 2021 - Sinch acquired Inteliquent for $1.14 billion.
- 2022 - Inteliquent receives Warning Letter from the United States Federal Trade Commission (FTC) for routing and transmitting illegal robocall traffic directly or indirectly involved in activities such as Social Security Administration imposters, utility disconnection scams, credit card rate reduction scams and car warranty scams, among others.
