= SIM box =

VOIP gateway component

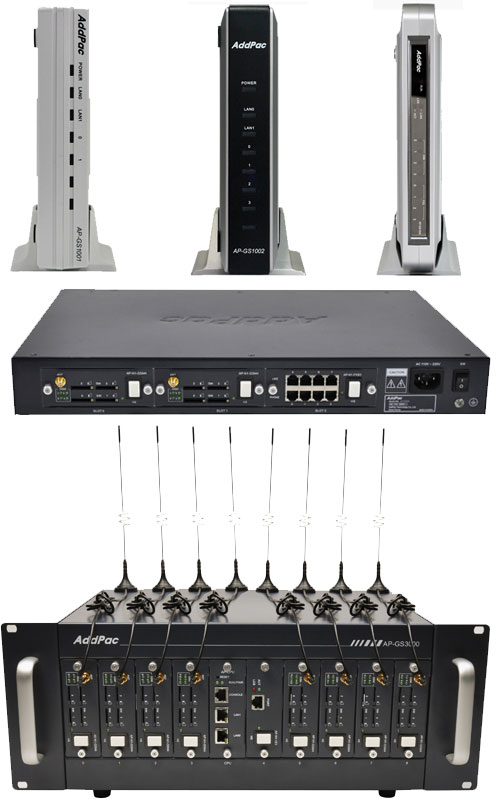
VoIP GSM gateways Addpac with a SIM box inside

A SIM box (also called a SIM bank or SIM server) is device used as part of a Voice-over-IP gateway installation. It contains a number of SIM cards, which are linked to the gateway but housed and stored separately from it. A SIM box can have SIM cards of different mobile operators installed, permitting it to operate with several GSM gateways located in different places.

A group of SIM boxes is sometimes called a SIM farm.

== Usage and detection ==
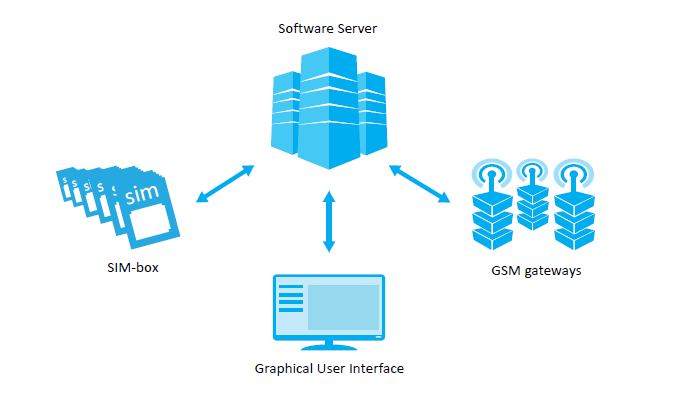
Scheme of VoIP call with SIM box and gateway

The SIM box operator can route calls through the VoIP connection and connect the call as local traffic, allowing the box's operator to bypass high international rates and to reduce prices charged by local mobile network operators (MNO). In voice communications, typically a private exchange is used to receive traffic from a local area, and the calls are routed over the internet to a SIM box in a remote region. This business model of operation is commonly used to avoid higher tolls for non-mobile long distance calls, particularly those associated with lesser-developed countries.

SIM boxes are often used for lower rate VoIP to MNO termination purposes, including avoidance of high tolls in violation of carriers' acceptable use policies and the sending of mobile text messaging spam.

Some carriers attempt to detect and deny service to SIM boxes through various means, including cancellation or restriction of service to identified SIMs. SIM box operators often swap SIMs to replace restricted ones. They may also rewrite the International Mobile Equipment Identity (IMEI) of the SIM box, often using randomized IMEIs in ranges of or those assigned to common mobile phone manufacturers to evade detection.

The use of SIM boxes is often legal, but the use may constitute breach of carrier contracts. One example is that of the country of Ghana, where the government has challenged the use of SIM boxes.

== Technical characteristics ==
As the normal mobile network are sometimes using a very outdated and low quality sound codecs (such as the GSM-HR and GSM-FR codecs), a SIM box may provide local connectivity with superior sound quality.

== Usage by country ==
In Australia, a lot of SIM boxes are used by scammers for sending out millions of text messages purporting to be from ATO, Centrelink, Medicare, Australia Post, Commonwealth Bank, Transurban, and Linkt.

== Controversies ==
In September 2025, the U.S. Secret Service dismantled a SIM box operation in the New York metropolitan area, seizing over 100,000 SIM cards and 300 servers capable of sending 30 million anonymous text messages per minute, jamming cellular networks, and disrupting emergency services. The network, uncovered during an investigation into telephonic threats against senior U.S. officials, was linked to foreign espionage and criminal cartels, with equipment stored within 35 miles of the headquarters of the United Nations amid preparations for the annual General Assembly.

On October 10, 2025, Europol Operation SIMCARTEL culminated in Latvia with the arrest of five and the seizure of 1,200 SIM boxes operating 40,000 SIM cards and hundreds of thousands more SIM cards, seizure of five servers, and dismantling of a network that supplied phone numbers from over 80 countries. Coordinated by Europol, Eurojust, and investigators from Austria, Estonia, Latvia, and Finland, the action involved 26 searches and the takedown of websites gogetsms.com and apisim.com. €431,000 and USD333,000 in suspects' crypto accounts were frozen and four luxury vehicles were seized. The network enabled over 49 million fake online accounts, facilitating phishing, smishing, investment fraud, daughter-son scams, fake shops and banks, impersonation of police, extortion, migrant smuggling, and child sexual abuse material distribution. Attributed losses exceeded €4.5 million in Austria and €420,000 in Latvia from 1,700 and 1,500 cases respectively, and total damages were estimated in the millions of euros across thousands of European victims.

== See also ==
- GoIP
