= Pac-West Telecomm =

Pac-West Telecomm, Inc.
- Company type: Private
- Industry: Telecom Service - Domestic & International
- Founded: 1980
- Headquarters: Oakland, California, United States
- Key people: James Hensel, CEO
- Products: Telecommunications

Pac-West Telecomm, Inc. was a privately owned, wholesale telecommunications carrier founded in 1980 and headquartered in Oakland, California. The company is one of the few wholesale-focused competitive local exchange carriers (CLEC) in the United States.

This company provides origination services to the Westcoast, Texas, Northeast including 31 states.

On March 28, 2013, Pac-West submitted its filing in the U.S. Bankruptcy Court in the Western District of Texas under Chapter 11 filing.

Pac-West has over 20 creditors, many of which are a mix of large service providers and CLECs including; AT&T (NYSE: T), CenturyLink (NYSE: CTL), Frontier (Nasdaq: FTR), Telus (Toronto: T.TO), and Alpheus Communications.

On September 9, 2013, TNCI Operating Company LLC completed the acquisition of Pac-West Telecomm Inc.

== Services ==
Pac-West provides termination, origination, and managed services to retail carriers and service providers. Service is provided exclusively on a wholesale basis with no retail operations to avoid channel conflict with its customers. In 2010, Pac-West launched Telastic, a hosted operating environment for telecom services that allows carriers and service providers to evolve from expensive legacy infrastructure to a scalable and cost-effective service based model.

Origination services and accompanying phone numbers are available in 31 states including Arizona, California, Colorado, Connecticut, DC, Idaho, Illinois, Indiana, Iowa, Massachusetts, Maryland, Maine, Michigan, Minnesota, Montana, New Hampshire, New Jersey, Nevada, New York, North Dakota, Ohio, Oregon, Pennsylvania, Rhode Island, South Dakota, Texas, Utah, Vermont, Washington, Wisconsin and Wyoming.

Managed Services include transport, managed modems, and colocation in seven data centers in California and Texas (Oakland, Los Angeles, Stockton, Dallas, Austin, San Antonio, and Houston).

Telastic Services include the Telastic Carrier Infrastructure providing a next generation software-based SBC that includes a suite of operator tools for managing IP-based communications traffic which include a least cost routing feature, rating, billing, vendor management, numbers management, CDR generation, fraud control, and an embedded VoIP peering feature for interconnection. Telastic Application Capacity provides capacity for communications applications, using Telastic's virtualisation service technology. It also includes features to choose phone numbers, provision them and route them to applications automatically. Telastic Turnkey Applications use Telastic's communications environment, providing a scalable packaged VoIP feature platform for white-label hosted IP/PBX, residential VoIP offerings and other telephony applications.
