= Call origination =

Call origination, also known as voice origination, refers to the collecting of the calls initiated by a calling party on a telephone exchange of the PSTN, and handing off the calls to a VoIP endpoint or to another exchange or telephone company for completion to a called party.

In the VoIP world, the opposite of call origination is call termination, where a call initiated as a VoIP call is terminated to the PSTN.

The term is often used in referring to a VoIP trunking service that provides the ability for calls to originate on the PSTN and be delivered to a customer's VoIP endpoint. It is often referred to as "DID" (for Direct Inward Dialing) which more properly refers to a service entirely within the PSTN where individual PSTN numbers can terminate on a customer's PBX.

In the United States, the carrier that originates a call is compensated through intercarrier compensation, the charges one carrier pays another to originate, transport and terminate telecommunications traffic. It takes two main forms, access charges and reciprocal compensation. When a caller places a regular long-distance call from a landline, the caller’s local exchange carrier routes the call to the caller’s long-distance carrier, which pays the local carrier for originating the call. By contrast, for a toll-free (8YY) call, the 8YY provider pays the caller’s local exchange carrier for originating the call and for performing the database query used to route it.
