= SIP trunking =

VOIP technology

SIP trunking is a voice over Internet Protocol (VoIP) technology and streaming media service based on the Session Initiation Protocol (SIP) by which Internet telephony service providers (ITSPs) deliver telephone services and unified communications to customers equipped with SIP-based private branch exchange (IP-PBX) and unified communications facilities. Most unified communications applications provide voice, video, and other streaming media applications such as desktop sharing, web conferencing, and shared whiteboard.

== Domains ==
The architecture of SIP trunking provides a partitioning of the unified communications network into two different domains of expertise:

- Private domain: refers to a part of the network connected to a PBX or unified communications server.
- Public domain: refers to the part of the network which allows access into the public switched telephone network (PSTN) or public land mobile network (PLMN).

The interconnection between the two domains must occur through a SIP trunk. The interconnection between the two domains, created by transport via the Internet Protocol (IP), involves setting specific rules and regulations as well as the ability to handle some services and protocols that fall under the name of SIP trunking.

The ITSP is responsible to the applicable regulatory authority regarding all the following law obligations of the public domain:

- Tracking traffic;
- Identification of users;
- Implementation of the lawful interception mechanisms.

The private domain instead, by nature, is not subject to particular constraints of law, and may be either the responsibility of the ITSP, the end user (enterprise), or of a third party who provides the voice services to the company.

== Architecture ==
Each domain has elements that perform the characteristic features requested of that domain, in particular the result (as part of any front-end network to the customer) is logically divided into two levels:

- The control of access (Class 5 softswitch);
- Network-border elements that separate the Public Domain from the Private Domain, implementing all the appropriate ITSP phone security policies.

The private domain consists of three levels:

- corporate-border elements that separate the public domain from the private domain, implementing the appropriate company security policies
- central corporate switching node
- IP PBXs

== See also ==
- Trunking
- Session border controller (SBC)
